This is a list of contemporary (20th- or 21st-century) show business families.

Families

A
Adams-Beaver
Actor Don Adams was the father of actress Cecily Adams. Cecily Adams was married to actor Jim Beaver. Adams' Get Smart series co-star Robert Karvelas was his cousin.

Aday
 Musician and part-time actor Michael Lee Aday (born Marvin Lee Aday), better known by his stage name of Meat Loaf, is the father of singer Pearl Aday and actress Amanda Aday.

Affleck
 Actor/director/writer/producer Ben Affleck was married to actress Jennifer Garner. He is now married to actress/singer Jennifer Lopez. His younger brother is fellow actor Casey Affleck, whose former wife is actress Summer Phoenix (see Phoenix siblings).

Alba/Warren
 Actress Jessica Alba is the daughter-in-law of actor Michael Warren. Her younger brother, Joshua Alba, is also an actor.

Alda
 Actor Robert Alda was the father of actor/director Alan Alda and actor Antony Alda.
 Alan is married to photographer and writer Arlene Alda; their children include actresses Beatrice and Elizabeth Alda.

Aldridge
 Artist Alan Aldridge, with his first wife, is the father of photographer Miles Aldridge and model Saffron Aldridge. With his second wife, Playboy Playmate Laura Lyons, he is the father of models Lily and Ruby Aldridge.
 Lily is married to the frontman of Kings of Leon, Caleb Followill (see Followill).
 Miles was formerly married to model Kristen McMenamy.

Allen
 Actress Martha-Bryan Allen is sister of actress Elizabeth Bryan Allen, wife of actor, Robert Montgomery (see Montgomery), by whom she had a daughter, actress Elizabeth Montgomery.

Allen
 Actor and director Kevin Allen is the older brother of actor and musician Keith Allen.
 Keith was married to film producer Alison Owen, with whom he has two children, musician and actress Lily Allen and actor Alfie Allen. He has also been married to film producer Nira Park and has a daughter with actress Tamzin Malleson.
 Lily is married to actor David Harbour.

Allen/Rashād
 Actress/director/singer Phylicia Rashad is the older sister of performer Debbie Allen, who is married to former NBA basketball player, Norm Nixon.
 Phylicia Rashad is the former spouse of both Victor Willis, former lead singer of the group Village People, and former NFL football player turned sportscaster, Ahmad Rashad. Phylicia and Ahmad Rashad are the parents of actress Condola Rashad.

Allman
 Brothers Gregg Allman and Duane Allman made up the band The Allman Brothers Band, and Gregg later created The Gregg Allman Band (see also Trippy).
 Gregg was once married to Cher (see Bono). With her he has musician son, Elijah Blue Allman. He also has son musician Devon Allman through a previous marriage. From another marriage he is also the father of Layla Allman, musician and lead singer of the band, Picture Me Broken.
 Elijah is married to German musician Marieangela "Queenie" King, of the family pop band KING, formed with her siblings (see King).

Aniston-Theroux
 Actor John Aniston and actress Nancy Dow are the parents of Jennifer Aniston, who was married to actor Brad Pitt (see Pitt-Jolie) and also married to actor Justin Theroux (see Theroux).
His cousin is documentary filmmaker Louis Theroux.

Appleton
 Nicole Appleton and older sister Natalie perform together in All Saints and Appleton.

Arden-Osbourne
 Music manager and agent Don Arden was the father of Sharon Osbourne (see Osbourne), the wife and manager of heavy metal icon Ozzy Osbourne. Sharon entered the public consciousness for the first time with the success of the reality TV show The Osbournes.
 The oldest of Ozzy and Sharon's children, Aimee Osbourne, chose not to appear on The Osbournes; she is an actress, singer, and writer. Her two younger siblings did appear on the show; Kelly is an actress and singer and Jack is a director and producer.

Arkin
 Actor/composer Alan Arkin, father of actors Adam, Matthew, and Anthony Arkin.
Adam is the father of Molly Arkin.

Armendáriz-Marín
 Mexican actor Pedro Armendáriz and wife Carmelita, herself an actress, were the parents of fellow actor Pedro Armendáriz, Jr. The father was a cousin of Mexican actress Gloria Marín.

Arnold-Jones
 Singer Monica is the cousin of record producer Polow da Don.

Arquette-Cox
 Actor/comedian/pianist/songwriter Cliff Arquette was the father of actor Lewis Arquette, who was the father of five actors:
Patricia Arquette, formerly married to actors Nicolas Cage and Thomas Jane.
Rosanna Arquette, formerly married to film composer James Newton Howard; she lived with, but never married, musician Peter Gabriel.
Alexis Arquette
David Arquette, who was married to actress Courteney Cox.

Asher
 Musician Peter Asher and actress Jane Asher are siblings. Peter is the father of musician Victoria Asher. (This family has no relation to actor William Asher below)

Asher-Bulifant
 William Asher, television actor, was born to stage actress Lillian Bonner and producer Ephraim M. Asher. His sister, Betty Asher, was an MGM publicist for Judy Garland. William was married to actress Danny Sue Nolan. Later he was married to actress Elizabeth Montgomery (see Montgomery) and they have daughter, Rebecca Asher, a film editor, and son and guitar maker, Bill Asher. Finally he married actress Joyce Bulifant (see Bulifant). He adopted Bulifant's son, actor John Asher, born to actor Edward Mallory (see Mallory).
 John first married actress Vanessa Lee Asher. John later married actress Jenny McCarthy (see McCarthy).

Astin/Duke
 Actors and former spouses John Astin and Patty Duke are the parents of actors Sean and Mackenzie Astin.

Auberjonois 
 Actor René Auberjonois is the father of actor Remy Auberjonois, who is married to actress Kate Nowlin.
 His daughter Tessa, an actress, married Adrian LaTourelle, who voiced Unalaq in Book 2 The Legend of Korra.

B
Baio
 Actor-brothers Jimmy and Joey Baio are the cousins of actor-director Scott Baio.

Baker
 Actress Carroll Baker is the mother of Blanche Baker.

Balcon/Day-Lewis
 Film producer Sir Michael Balcon was the father of actress Jill Balcon who was married to poet and writer Cecil Day-Lewis. They are parents of documentary maker and television chef Tamasin Day-Lewis and actor Daniel Day-Lewis.
Daniel is married to director Rebecca Miller, daughter of playwright Arthur Miller.

Baldwin
 Brothers and actors Alec Baldwin, William Baldwin, Stephen Baldwin and Daniel Baldwin
 Alec was married to actress Kim Basinger. Together they are the parents of model Ireland Baldwin.
 William is currently married to singer Chynna Phillips (see Phillips).
 Stephen is the father of model Hailey Baldwin.
Note: Actor Adam Baldwin is not related to the preceding Baldwins.

Ball-Arnaz-Luckinbill
 Actress Lucille Ball and her first husband, musician and actor Desi Arnaz are the parents of actors Lucie Arnaz and Desi Arnaz, Jr. Lucille Ball later married comedian Gary Morton.
Lucie is married to actor Laurence Luckinbill. Luckinbill was previously married to actress Robin Strasser.
Desi Jr. was married to actress Linda Purl.

Banai
 Yossi, Gavri, Ya'akov and Haim Banai were Israeli brothers who were all singers and actors.
Among Ya'akov's children was singer-songwriter Ehud Banai.
Among Yossi's children was Yuval Banai, lead singer of rock band Mashina. Yuval was formerly married to singer and actress Orly Silbersatz Banai.
One of Yuval and Orly's children is singer and musician Elisha Banai.
Another brother, Yitzhak, a judge, had among his children singer-songwriters Meir and Eviatar Banai, and actress Orna Banai.

Banquells-Pinal-Pasquel-Alatriste-Guzman-Salas
 Actress/Producer Silvia Pinal was married first to actor Rafael Banquells, and then to actor/producer Gustavo Alatriste, and later to actor/singer Enrique Guzman.
Pinal and Banquells gave birth to actress Silvia Pasquel. Pasquel's younger sister by means of her father's remarriage is actress/singer Rocio Banquells. Pinal and Alatriste were the parents of actress Viridiana Alatriste, and Pinal and Guzman gave birth to Luis Enrique Guzman and singer Alejandra Guzman.
Actress Stephanie Salas is the daughter of Silvia Pasquel.

Bannon-Benaderet
 Actor Jim Bannon and actress Bea Benaderet were the parents of actor Jack Bannon, who is married to retired actress Ellen Travolta, older sister of actor John Travolta.

Bardem-Cruz
 Actors Rafael Bardem and Matilde Muñoz Sampedro were the parents of actress Pilar Bardem and screenwriter and director Juan Antonio Bardem.
Pilar is the mother of actors Carlos, Mónica and Javier Bardem.
Javier is married to actress Penélope Cruz, whose sister is actress Mónica Cruz.

 Barry
 Actor Raymond J. Barry was the son of actress B. Constance Barry (born Beatrice Constance Duffy).

Barrymore-Costello
19th century stage actors Maurice Barrymore and Georgiana Drew were the parents of actors Lionel, Ethel and John Barrymore.
  John was the father of actor John Drew Barrymore by his third wife, actress Dolores Costello, and actress Diana Barrymore by his second wife, actress Blanche Oelrichs.
 Actor John Drew Barrymore married first actress Cara Williams. From his subsequent marriage to actress/manager Jaid Barrymore (née Ildiko Jaid Mako), he was the father of actress Drew Barrymore. Drew was briefly married to MTV host and comedian Tom Green. His last marriage was to actress Nina Wayne.
 Lionel married silent film actresses Irene Fenwick and Doris Rankin.
 Diana married actors Bramwell Fletcher and Robert Wilcox.

Basehart
 Actor Richard Basehart was the father of actor Jackie Basehart.

Bateman-Anka
 Producer Kent Bateman is the father of actors Jason and Justine Bateman.
Jason is married to actress Amanda Anka, daughter of singer Paul Anka.

Beatty-MacLaine-Bening
 Warren Beatty, brother of Shirley MacLaine and husband of Annette Bening.
Shirley is the mother of actress Sachi Parker.

Beery
 Actors, Wallace, Noah, and William Beery are brothers.
 Noah's son Noah Beery, Jr. became a film and television star.
 Wallace was married to actress, Gloria Swanson.
 Gloria's daughter from another marriage, Gloria Swanson Somborn, is also an actress.

Begley
 Academy Award-winning actor, Ed Begley's, son is actor and environmental activist, Ed Begley, Jr.

Bellisario
 Producer and screenwriter, Donald P. Bellisario, was married four times. His children include:
 Television producers, David and Julie Bellisario Watson (by his first wife, Margaret Schaffran).
 Actor, Michael Bellisario (by second wife, Lynn Halpern).
 Actress, Troian Bellisario (by third wife, actress and producer, Deborah Pratt). Troian is married to actor Patrick J. Adams.
 Two stepsons – actor, Sean Murray, and producer, Chad W. Murray – from his current wife, Vivienne's, first marriage.

Bergen
 Ventriloquist, Edgar Bergen, and his wife, model and actress, Frances Bergen (née Westerman), are the parents of actress, Candice Bergen.
 Candice was married to French director, Louis Malle.

Berggren
 Musician, Jonas Berggren, and his younger sisters, Malin (better known as Linn) and Jenny, are founding members of Ace of Base.
 Jenny married musician, Jakob Petrén.

Bettany
 Actor, dancer, and drama teacher, Thane Bettany, is the father of actor, Paul Bettany.
 Paul married actress, Jennifer Connelly.

Bilson
 Director and producer, George Bilson, is the father of Bruce Bilson, also a director, and acclaimed fortepianist, Malcolm Bilson, with wife and screenwriter, Hattie Bilson.
 Bruce is the father of writer, director and producer, Danny Bilson, and film producer, Julie Ahlberg. He also married actress, Renne Jarrett.
 Danny is the father of actress, Rachel Bilson, from his first marriage. He also married actress, Heather Medway.
 Renne previously married to actor, Jack Stauffer (see Stauffer).
 Rachel married actor, Hayden Christensen.

Blocker
 Actor Dan Blocker, is the father of actor Dirk Blocker and producer David Blocker. Dan's most notable character is Eric "Hoss" Cartwright on the television show Bonanza. 
 
Bono
 Actor, singer, producer, and politician Sonny Bono was married to singer, director, producer, and actress Cher and are the parents of actor and activist Chaz Bono.

Booth
 Actor Junius Brutus Booth was the father of actor Junius Brutus Booth, Jr., actor Sydney Barton Booth, actor-producer Edwin Booth, actor John Wilkes Booth and writer Asia Booth.
 Junius Jr. was married to actress Agnes Booth.
 Asia Booth was married to actor-comedian and manager John Sleeper Clarke, and their sons were actors Creston and Wilfred Clarke.

Booth
 Actor, Antony Booth, married four times with eight children. He is the father of Cherie Booth of the King's Counsel with first wife and actress, Gale Howard (née Joyce Smith). With another partner he is the father of Lauren Booth, an English broadcaster and journalist. The second of his four wiveswas the actress, Pat Phoenix.
 Pat was first married to actor, Peter Marsh, and later married actor, Alan Browning, until his death.

Booth families are unrelated.

Boreanaz (Roberts)
 Broadcaster and presenter, Dave Roberts (née David Thomas Boreanaz), is the father of actor, David Boreanaz, who is married to former Playmate and actress, Jaime Bergman.

Bracco
 Sisters, Elizabeth and Lorraine Bracco, are actresses.

Braga
 Brazilian Actress Alice Braga is daughter to Ana Braga and niece to Sônia Braga.

Bridges
 Actor Lloyd Bridges and his actress wife Dorothy (née Simpson) were the parents of actors Jeff and Beau Bridges.
 Beau is father of actor Jordan Bridges.

Bridgewater/Moses
 Singer Dee Dee Bridgewater and former husband director Gilbert Moses are the parents of singer China Moses.

Broadus-Norwood
 Rapper Snoop Dogg is the first cousin of singers Brandy and Ray J, who are the children of gospel singer Willie Norwood, and of professional wrestler/actress Sasha Banks.

Broderick
Actor Matthew Broderick is the son of actor James Broderick. Matthew is married to actress Sarah Jessica Parker.

Brolin
 see Streisand-Gould-Brolin.

Brooks-Bancroft
 Hollywood comedian-director Mel Brooks married actress Anne Bancroft.

Brosnan-Harris
 Actor Pierce Brosnan first wife was actress Cassandra Harris. Together, they were parents of actor Sean Brosnan.
Cassandra's first husband was Dermot Harris (a younger brother of Irish actor Richard Harris), with whom she had two children: Chris Brosnan and late Charlotte. After Harris' death, both were adopted by Brosnan.

Bulifant
 Actress, Joyce Bulifant was married first to actor, James MacArthur (see MacArthur), then to actor, Edward Mallory, then to actor, William Asher (see Asher-Bulifant), and finally to actor, Roger Perry. She is the mother of actor, John Mallory Asher (biological son of Edward Mallory).
 Perry was once married to actress, Jo Anne Worley, for many years.
 Mallory later married actress, Susanne Zenor.

Burnett-Hamilton
 Actress/comedian Carol Burnett and her one-time husband, TV producer Joe Hamilton, are the parents of recording artist Erin Hamilton and actress Carrie Hamilton.

Busey
 Gary Busey is the father of Jake Busey. (Their legal names are William Gareth Jacob Busey, Sr. and William Gareth Jacob Busey, Jr., respectively.) 

Butterworth
 Actor and comedian Peter Butterworth was married to the actress and impressionist Janet Brown. Peter and Janet were the parents of actor Tyler Butterworth; Tyler is married to actress Janet Dibley.

C
Caan
 Actor James Caan is the father of actor Scott Caan.

Cameron
 Actors Kirk and Candace Cameron are brother and sister. Kirk's wife is actress Chelsea Noble.

Capra
 Film director Frank Capra was the father of movie studio executive Frank Capra, Jr.
 Frank, Jr. was in turn father to film director Frank Capra III.

Carey-Baskauskas
 Actor Macdonald Carey was the father of singer and actress Lynn Carey.
 Another daughter, Theresa, is the mother of reality television personality Aras Baskauskas.

Carradine/Bowen/Plimpton
 Actor John Carradine was the father of four actors. Bruce Carradine, whom John adopted, was the son of his first wife Ardanelle McCool from a previous marriage, and David Carradine was his son by Ardanelle. Keith and Robert Carradine are John's sons from his second marriage to Sonia Sorel. She later had a son by artist Michael Bowen; their son is actor Michael Bowen.
 Keith is the father of actress Martha Plimpton from a relationship with actress Shelley Plimpton.
 Robert is the father of actress Ever Carradine.

Carpio
 Singer Teresa Carpio is the mother of actress and singer T.V. Carpio.

Carter-Cash
 The original Carter Family, a seminal country music group, consisted of A. P. Carter, his wife, Sara Carter, and his sister-in-law and Sara's cousin, Maybelle Carter.
 Two of A. P. and Sara's children, Joe Carter and Janette Carter, followed in their parents' footsteps.
 Maybelle had three daughters who entered the country music business, and performed with her for a time—Anita Carter, June Carter Cash, and Helen Carter.
 June and her first husband, country singer, Carl Smith, were the parents of country singer, Carlene Carter. Carlene was married to singer-songwriter-producer, Nick Lowe, from 1979 to 1990.
 June was the mother of country singer-songwriter, Rosie Nix Adams, by her second husband, Edwin "Rip" Nix.
 June's third husband was singer, Johnny Cash. They were the parents of singer, songwriter, and producer, John Carter Cash.
 Johnny was the father of country singer, Rosanne Cash, from his first marriage to Vivian Liberto. Rosanne was married to country superstar, Rodney Crowell, from 1979 to 1992. She then married musician, John Leventhal.

Casadesus
 Patriarch, Luis Casadesus and matriarch, Mathilde Senechal, began the prominent French family. They are the parents of composer, Francis Casadesus.
 Francis is the father of pianist, Rose Casadesus.
 Rose is the mother of violist, Henri Casadesus, violinist, Marius Casadesus, and composer, Robert-Guillaume Casadesus (known as Robert Casa).
 Henri is the father of actor, Christian Casadesus, and actress, Gisèle Casadesus, with harpist, Marie-Louise Beetz.
 Gisèle married the actor, Lucien Pascal (born Lucien Probst), with whom she had four children: conductor, Jean-Claude Casadesus, actress Martine Pascal, artist Béatrice Casadesus, and composer, Dominique Probst.
 Jean-Claude has daughter and opera singer, Caroline Casadesus, and son and film director, Sebastian Copeland, with his first wife. With his second wife, he has son and actor, Olivier Casadesus.
 Caroline was married to the violinist and composer, Didier Lockwood. They are the parents of violinist and composer, Thomas Enhco.
 Didier is now married to opera singer, Patricia Petibon. She was previously married to composer, Eric Tanguy.
 Sebastian was married to model and actress, Brigitte Nielsen. He is also the cousin of actor, Orlando Bloom.
 Nielsen has been married five times. She was first married to composer Kasper Winding (see Winding). Their son is television personality, Julian Winding. She has also been married to actor Sylvester Stallone (see Stallone), television writer Raoul Meyer and producer Mattia Dessi.
 Orlando was married to supermodel Miranda Kerr.
 Martine was married to art director Willy Holt.
 Robert-Guillaume is the father of the classical pianist Robert Casadesus.
 Robert married pianist Gaby Casadesus. They have son and pianist, Jean Casadesus.
 Jean married Evie Girard (see Girard).

Cassavetes
 Actress Katherine Cassavetes was the mother of director John Cassavetes.
 John and his wife, actress Gena Rowlands, were parents to filmmakers Nick Cassavetes director of The Notebook, Zoe Cassavetes director of Broken English, and Alexandra Cassavetes.

Cassidy-Jones
 Actor Jack Cassidy was the father of singer/actor David Cassidy by his first wife, actress Evelyn Ward. He and his second wife, singer and actress Shirley Jones, had three sons—singer/actor Shaun Cassidy and actors Patrick and Ryan Cassidy.
 David's first wife was actress Kay Lenz. He is the father of actress and singer Katie Cassidy from a relationship with model Sherry Benedon.
 Shaun was married to model Ann Pennington and actress Susan Diol. His current wife is producer Tracey Turner.

Chambers
 Singer Lester Chambers is the brother of Willie, George and Joe Chambers and like them a former member of 1960s group The Chambers Brothers.

Chan
 Actor Jaycee is the son of actors Joan Lin and Jackie Chan (a famous martial artist).

Chaney
 Lon Chaney, Sr. is the father of actor Lon Chaney, Jr.

Chapin
 Jazz drummer Jim Chapin is the father of musicians Harry, Tom, and Steve Chapin.
 Harry was the father of singer Jen Chapin.
 Tom is the father of Abigail and Lily Chapin, two-thirds of the Chapin Sisters folk music group. He is the stepfather of the third member, Jessica Craven, daughter of film director Wes Craven.

Chaplin

 Comedian Charlie Chaplin was the half-brother of actor Sydney Chaplin and the father of actors Sydney Chaplin and Geraldine Chaplin. His granddaughter is actress Oona Chaplin.

Chong
 Actor-comedian Tommy Chong is the father of fellow actors Marcus, Robbi and Rae Dawn Chong.

Cheng
 Actress Joyce Cheng is the daughter of actors Adam Cheng and Lydia Shum.

Chuckle-Patton
 Paul and Barry Chuckle, known as the Chuckle Brothers, and their elder brothers, The Patton Brothers are the son of James Patton Elliott, a Gang Show performer known as Gene Patton. The brothers appear together on ChuckleVision.

Cleese
 Comedian, actor and screenwriter John Cleese was married to Connie Booth and their daughter is actress Cynthia Cleese, who is married to producer and director Ed Solomon.

Clooney-Ferrer-Boone
 News anchor and politician Nick Clooney is the father of actor/producer/director George Clooney; George was married to actress Talia Balsam, daughter of Joyce Van Patten and Martin Balsam.
 Nick Clooney's sisters were Elizabeth ("Betty") Clooney and actress/singer Rosemary Clooney. Rosemary Clooney was married to actor José Ferrer, who in turn was previously married to actress/acting teacher Uta Hagen. Clooney and Ferrer were the parents of actor Miguel Ferrer and Gabriel Ferrer.
 Gabriel married singer/actress Debby Boone; their twin daughters are Dustin and Gabi.
 Debby is a member of the singing Boone Sisters, cousins of actor Randy Boone and the daughters of singer Pat Boone.
Note: Actor Mel Ferrer is unrelated to this family

Clunes
 Actor/producer Alec Clunes was the father of actor Martin Clunes

Coen-McDormand
Director/producer brothers Ethan and Joel Coen; Joel is married to Oscar-winning actress Frances McDormand

Cole
 The brothers Nat King Cole, Ike Cole and Freddy Cole were all jazz singers and pianists.
 Nat King Cole was the father of singer-songwriter Natalie Cole.
 Freddy Cole is the father of musician and songwriter Lionel Cole.

Compton-Pelissier-Reed
 Actress Fay Compton (whose brother was the writer Sir Compton Mackenzie) married the producer H. G. Pelissier; their son was producer/director Anthony Pelissier who married actor Penelope Dudley-Ward; their daughter being actor Tracy Reed who adopted the surname Reed following her mother's second marriage – to film director Sir Carol Reed, Tracy married actor Edward Fox (see Fox acting family below)

Connery
 Actor Sir Sean Connery, whose first wife was Australian actress Diane Cilento; brother of actor Neil Connery.
 Sean's son is actor Jason Connery, who was married to actress Mia Sara.

Conte
 Guitarist Bruce Conte of Tower of Power is the cousin of bassist Victor Conte

Conti
 Actors Tom Conti and Kara Wilson are parents of actress/ventriloquist Nina Conti.

Contostavlos
 Mungo Jerry bassist Byron Contostavlos is the father of Dino "Dappy" Contostavlos and uncle of Tula "Tulisa" Contostavlos, both of N-Dubz.

Coppola-Shire-Schwartzman-Vogelsang-Cage
 Composers Anton Coppola and Carmine Coppola are brothers.
 Carmine was the father of director Francis Ford Coppola and actress Talia Shire, as well as literature professor August Coppola.
Talia's first marriage was to composer David Shire. She is the widow of producer Jack Schwartzman. Shire and Schwartzman are the parents of actor/musicians Jason Schwartzman and Robert Carmine. Jack was the father of cinematographer John Schwartzman by an earlier marriage.
 Francis and his wife, set decorator and artist Eleanor Neal Coppola, are the parents of film producer Gian-Carlo Coppola, director Roman Coppola, and film multihyphenate Sofia Coppola. Sofia was married to director Spike Jonze.
 August and his former wife, dancer and choreographer Joy Vogelsang, are parents of actor and radio DJ Marc Coppola, director-producer Christopher Coppola, and actor Nicholas Coppola, better known by his stage name of Nicolas Cage. Nicolas was married to both actress Patricia Arquette and singer Lisa Marie Presley.

Corbett
 Harry Corbett, creator of the Sooty glove puppet and its TV shows, is the father of Matthew Corbett.

Coren
 Broadcaster, satirist and journalist Alan Coren is the father Victoria Coren, married to comedian and actor David Mitchell.

Corfixen
 Cinematographer, Teit Jørgensen, and actress and editor, Lizzie Corfixen, are the parents of actress, Liv Corfixen.
 Liv is married to actor, Nicolas Winding Refn (see Winding).

Corr
 Jim, Andrea, Caroline and Sharon Corr are members of the Irish-based folk group The Corrs

Costello
 Actor Maurice Costello and daughters Dolores Costello and Helene Costello. Great-granddaughter Drew Barrymore (granddaughter of Dolores).

Crosby-Edwards
 Singer-actor Bing Crosby was the father of: Gary; Dennis; Phillip; Harry; Lindsay; Mary and Nathaniel. Dennis was the father of actress Denise Crosby, who was married to Blake Edwards' son, Geoff. Geoff's sister is actress Jennifer Edwards.

Crosby-Raymond
 Oscar-winning cinematographer Floyd Crosby was the father of musician David Crosby (The Byrds, CSNY).
 David is part of the jazz-rock band CPR with his biological son James Raymond.

Cruise-Mapother
 Actor Tom Cruise (born Thomas Cruise Mapother IV), is the cousin of actor William Mapother, and actress Amy Mapother, William's sister.
 Tom has been married to actresses Mimi Rogers, Nicole Kidman (see Kidman) and Katie Holmes.

Cruttwell
 The son of theatre director Hugh Cruttwell and actress Geraldine McEwan is screenwriter/producer Greg Cruttwell.

Culkin
 Bonnie Bedelia Culkin is the sister of Kit Culkin who is the father of actors, Macaulay Culkin, Kieran Culkin, Dakota Culkin, Rory Culkin, Shane Culkin, Christian Culkin and Quinn Culkin. Macaulay was married to actress Rachel Miner.

Cumberbatch-Ventham
 Actors Timothy Carlton (full name Timothy Carlton Cumberbatch) and Wanda Ventham are the parents of actor Benedict Cumberbatch.

Curtis-Leigh-Guest
 Actors Tony Curtis and Janet Leigh were the parents of actresses Jamie Lee and Kelly Curtis; the girls' half-sister is actress Allegra Curtis. **Jamie Lee is married to comedian and actor Christopher Guest. His brother Nicholas Guest is also an actor, and their older half-brother Anthony Haden-Guest is a writer.

Cusack (Ireland)
 The actress Alice Violet Cole Cusack was the mother of actor Cyril Cusack.
 Cyril is the father of six children, five of whom are actors. Niamh, Pádraig, Paul, Sorcha and Sinéad are his children with his first wife, actress Mary Margaret "Maureen" Kiely. His youngest daughter Catherine is his daughter by his second wife.
 Niamh Cusack is married to actor Finbar Lynch.
 Paul Cusack is a television producer.
 Sinéad Cusack is married to the actor Jeremy Irons (see Irons). Their sons, Samuel and Max Irons, are also actors. Sinéad has another biological son, the politician Richard Boyd Barrett, who was given up for adoption.

Cusack (USA)
 Dick Cusack took to acting late in life. He is the father of actors, John, Joan, Ann, Bill and Susie Cusack.

Cyrus
 Politician Ron Cyrus is the father of singer and actor Billy Ray Cyrus.
 Billy Ray was first married to songwriter, Cindy Smith. He is the father of singer and actress Miley Cyrus. Billy Ray's adopted son and Miley's half-brother, Trace Cyrus, is a member of pop band, Metro Station. The youngest member of the family, Noah, is an actress.

D
d'Abo
 Actress Maryam d'Abo and singer-songwriter Mike d'Abo are first cousins. Among Mike's children is actress Olivia d'Abo.

Daly
 Actor James Daly was father of actress Tyne Daly and actor Tim Daly. Tyne was married to actor/director Georg Stanford Brown and one of their daughters, Kathryne Dora Brown, is an actress. Tim is married to actress Amy Van Nostrand, their son Sam is an actor.

Davis (Robert)
 Comedian, Jasper Carrott (born Robert Davis), is the father of actress, Lucy Davis.
 Lucy was previously married to Welsh actor, Owain Yeoman.

Davis (Sammy)
 Vaudeville dancers, Sammy Davis, Sr. and Elvera Sánchez, are the parents of entertainer, Sammy Davis, Jr.
 Sammy Davis, Jr. was married to Swedish actress, May Britt.

Davison–Dickinson–Moffett
 English actor, Peter Davison and his former wife, American actress, Sandra Dickinson, are the parents of English actress, Georgia Tennant (née Moffett).
 Georgia's husband is actor, David Tennant.

Day-Lewis
 Poet and writer, Cecil Day-Lewis, and actress, Jill Balcon, are the parents of actor, Daniel, and sister, Tamasin Day-Lewis, a documentary maker and television chef.
 Daniel is married to director and screenwriter, Rebecca Miller (see Miller).

DeGeneres
 Television host and comedian, Ellen DeGeneres, and actor, Vance DeGeneres, are siblings.
 Ellen is married to actress and model Portia de Rossi.

del Toro
 Actor, Benicio del Toro, has a Puerto Rican cousin and basketball player, Carlos Arroyo, a Spanish cousin and pop-eurodance singer, Rebeca Pous Del Toro. He has a daughter with model, Kimberly Stewart (see Stewart).
 Rebeca is the daughter of singer, Franciska, and painter, José María Pous. She is the niece of Puerto Rican singer, Eliseo Del Toro.

DeLuise
 Actor Dominick "Dom" DeLuise is the father of actors Peter, David, and Michael DeLuise.

De Laurentiis
 Motion picture-producer Dino De Laurentiis is the brother of fellow producer Luigi De Laurentiis, whose son (Dino's nephew) is fellow producer Aurelio De Laurentiis. Dino's son and daughters are fellow producers Federico, Francesca and Rafaella De Laurentiis. Dino's daughter, Veronica is an author and actress; Veronica's daughter, Dino's granddaughter, is Giada De Laurentiis, a celebrity chef, author, and television personality.

De Llano–Macedo
 Actors Luis de Llano Palmer and Rita Macedo were the parents of actress and singer Julissa and telenovela producer Luis de Llano Macedo. Julissa was married to musician Benny Ibarra.

de Mille
 Playwright Henry C. de Mille was the father of playwright film director William de Mille and film director Cecil B. DeMille. William was the father of dancer choreographer Agnes de Mille.

Demme
 Film director Jonathan Demme was the uncle of film director Ted Demme.

Dennehy
 Brian Dennehy is the father of actresses Elizabeth and Kathleen Dennehy.

Depardieu
 Gérard and Élisabeth Depardieu are the parents of actors Guillaume and Julie Depardieu.

Dern
 Actor Director Bruce Dern and actress Diane Ladd are the parents of actress Laura Dern

Deschanel
 Cinematographer Caleb Deschanel and his wife, actress Mary Jo Deschanel (née Weir), are the father and mother of actresses Zooey and Emily Deschanel.
Emily is married to actor David Hornsby
Zooey was married to indie rock musician Ben Gibbard

Dickens–Napier–Raine–Forster
 Author Charles Dickens was the great-great-great-grandfather of actors Harry Lloyd and Gerald Dickens. Dickens' great-granddaughter Aileen Dickens Hawksley, who went by Gypsy, was the wife of British actor Alan Napier. Alan's daughter, actress Jennifer Raine, was the mother of actor Brian Forster.

Dillon–Raymond
 Actors Matt and Kevin Dillon are the great-nephews of cartoonist Alex Raymond, who created Flash Gordon.

Disney
 Animation pioneer Walt Disney was brother of Roy O. Disney; the two founded The Walt Disney Company, Roy's son Roy E. Disney was once head of Walt Disney Feature Animation before resigning. They are cousins to voice artist Melissa Disney.

Dolenz–Johnson–Juste–Trimble
 Italian-born Slovenian film actor George Dolenz and his wife, stage actress and singer Janelle Johnson, were the parents of musician and actor Micky Dolenz, best known as a member of The Monkees.
 Micky and his former wife, British model and TV presenter Samantha Juste, are the parents of actress Ami Dolenz, who is married to kickboxer-actor Jerry Trimble.

Dosamantes–Rubio
 Actress Susana Dosamantes and her husband, Enrique Rubio, have been the parents of actress/singer Paulina Rubio.

Dotrice
 Actor Roy Dotrice and late wife actress Kay Dotrice (née Newman) are the parents of actresses Karen and Michele Dotrice; Michele is the widow of actor Edward Woodward.

Douglas
 Actor Kirk Douglas is the father of actor Michael Douglas and producer Joel Douglas by his first wife, actress Diana (née Dill); and of producer Peter Douglas and comic and the late actor Eric Douglas by his second wife, actress Anne Buydens.
 Michael is the father of actor Cameron Douglas by his first wife, Diandra Luker, and is currently married to actress Catherine Zeta-Jones.

Dragon–Tennille
Composer Carmen Dragon is the father of composer/musician Daryl "the Captain" Dragon, partner and former husband of singer Toni Tennille.

Draper–Wolff–Mulligan
 Actress/writer Polly Draper was the star of ABC's television series Thirtysomething. She served as creator, executive producer, writer and director of Nickelodeon's The Naked Brothers Band TV show, starring her singer-songwriting/musician sons Nat Wolff and Alex Wolff. Her husband and the siblings' father is jazz pianist/recording artist Michael Wolff, who was the bandleader for The Arsenio Hall Show. He was cast in the Nickelodeon series.
 Actress Jesse Draper was a star on The Naked Brothers Band and is the producer and host of the web series The Valley Girl Show. She is the daughter of venture capitalist Tim Draper, a recurring star and consulting producer for The Naked Brothers Band. Her aunt is Polly Draper and her cousins are Nat and Alex Wolff.
 Jesse Draper's brothers, Billy and Adam, are recurring stars on The Naked Brothers Band.
 Coulter Mulligan, a recurring star on The Naked Brothers Band, is a nephew of Polly Draper, and cousin of Jesse, Billy and Adam Draper, and Nat and Alex Wolff.

Drucker
 The husband-and-wife classical clarinetists Stanley and Naomi Drucker are the parents of rockabilly double bassist Leon Drucker, better known as Lee Rocker, and alt-country singer-songwriter Rosanne Drucker.

Duclon–Johnson
 Actress Cherie Johnson, who starred on Punky Brewster, is the niece of that show's creator/producer David W. Duclon.

Dulfer
 Saxophonist Hans Dulfer is the father of fellow saxophonist Candy Dulfer.

Dunne–Didion
 Writer John Gregory Dunne was husband of writer Joan Didion and brother of journalist Dominick Dunne; Dominick is father to actor-director Griffin Dunne and the murdered actress Dominique Dunne

Durcal–Morales
Júnior Morales, Rocío Dúrcal and their daughter Shaila Dúrcal are singers.

Duvitski–Bentall
Actress Janine Duvitski is the mother of actress Ruby Bentall.

Dylan
 Musician Bob Dylan and his first wife, former model Sara Dylan, are the parents of film director Jesse Dylan and musician Jakob Dylan. Jesse's wife Susan Traylor and Jakob's wife Paige Dylan are both actresses.

E
Eastwood
 Actor/composer/director/producer Clint Eastwood is the father of actress/director Alison Eastwood, actor/jazz musician Kyle Eastwood and actor Scott Eastwood. Eastwood has one daughter with Frances Fisher, actress-model Francesca Fisher-Eastwood.

Ebsen
 Actor-dancer Buddy Ebsen, who performed with his sister, Vilma Ebsen, was the father of musician Kiki Ebsen.

Ecclestone
 Formula One billionaire, Bernie Ecclestone, and former Armani model, Slavica Ecclestone, are the parents of socialite and billionaire, Petra Ecclestone. Their other daughter, Tamara Ecclestone, is also a model and socialite.
 Petra is married to businessman, James Stunt.

Edmondson
 Comedian, actor, and singer Ade Edmondson and comedian-actress Jennifer Saunders are the parents of singer-songwriter, Ella Edmondson.

Einstein
 Comedian Harry Parke (born Harry Einstein) and his wife and actress Thelma Leeds are the parents of actor and comedy writer Bob Einstein and entertainer Albert Brooks (born Albert Lawrence Einstein).

Eisley
 Actor Anthony Eisley was the father of singer and actor David Glen Eisley.
 David is married to actress Olivia Hussey, and they are the parents of actress India Eisley.

Elfman
 Danny Elfman, musician and film composer, married to actress Bridget Fonda, his younger brother Eddie Elfman (see below, "Fonda acting family"); brother of film director Richard Elfman, Richard is father of actor Bodhi Elfman, who married actress Jenna Elfman; Jenna is niece of singer Tony Butala of The Lettermen.

Elliott
 Bob Elliott married Bob and Ray writer, Raymond Knight's widow, Lee. Their son is comedian, Chris Elliott.
 Chris's daughter is comedian, Abby Elliott, who has sometimes performed with her younger sister, Bridey.

Elwes
 Producer Cassian Elwes and his brother, actor, Cary Elwes.

Emmanuel
 Australian guitar master Tommy Emmanuel has a brother Phil Emmanuel who often plays with him on-stage.

Escovedo
 Musicians Pete, Coke, Alejandro, Mario (of The Dragons) and Javier Escovedo (of The Zeros) are all brothers.
 Pete is the father of musicians Sheila E. and Peter Michael Escovedo.
 Peter Michael is the biological father of designer and television personality Nicole Richie.

Estevez
 Actors Martin Sheen (born Ramón Estévez) and Joe Estevez are brothers. Martin is married to actress Janet Templeton.
 Martin and Janet are the parents of four children, all actors: Charlie Sheen (born Carlos Estévez), Emilio Estevez, Ramon Estevez, Jr., and Renée Estevez. Charlie was married to actress Denise Richards. Emilio was married to singer Paula Abdul.

F
Fabray/Fabares-Farrell
 Actress Nanette Fabray is the aunt of fellow actress Shelley Fabares (Fabares is the actual family name). Shelley is the wife of actor Mike Farrell.

Fairbanks
 Actor/producer Douglas Fairbanks married actress Mary Pickford; father of actor Douglas Fairbanks, Jr. who was the first husband of actress Joan Crawford.

Fan
 Actor Louis Fan is the son of Fan Mei-Sheng, a martial arts actor of the 1970s.

Farnum
 Actor William Farnum and his brother Dustin were actors on stage and screen

Farrow-Previn-Allen
 Director John Farrow and actress Maureen O'Sullivan are the parents of actresses Mia and Tisa Farrow and film producer Prudence Farrow.
 Mia was married to both Frank Sinatra and musician André Previn. After her divorce from Previn, she was in a long-term relationship with entertainment multihyphenate Woody Allen that ended when Allen became romantically involved with (and ultimately married) Soon-Yi Previn, Mia's adoptive daughter with Previn.

Fields
 Actress Chip Fields is the mother of actresses Kim, Jere and Alexis Fields.

Fields/Lander
 Bandleader Shep Fields was an elder brother of theatrical agent and film producer Freddie Fields who was married firstly to former child star Edith Fellows and secondly to actress Polly Bergen; by his first wife he is the father of actress Kathy Fields who is married to actor David Lander, they are the parents of actress and singer Natalie Lander.

Fiennes
Photographer Mark Fiennes was married to novelist and painter Jennifer Lash had six children, among them actors Ralph and Joseph, film-makers Martha and Sophie and composer Magnus. Mark is part of the Twisleton-Wykeham-Fiennes family which includes his third cousin adventurer and writer Ranulph Fiennes.
Ralph was married to actress Alex Kingston and long-time partner of actress Francesca Annis.
Martha is married to director George Tiffin and their son is child actor Hero Fiennes-Tiffin.

Figueroa/Sebastian
Joan Sebastian and his son José Manuel Figueroa (Figueroa is the actual family name) are singers, as is Sebastian's ex-wife, Maribel Guardia, who is also an actress.

Fisher-Reynolds-Taylor
 Singer Eddie Fisher married actress and singer Debbie Reynolds, by whom he fathered actress and writer Carrie Fisher and a son, producer Todd Fisher; he later married actress Elizabeth Taylor, and later still singer Connie Stevens, which marriage produced actress Joely Fisher. Carrie Fisher had a daughter with talent agent Bryan Lourd, Billie Lourd, who is also an actress.

Fitzalan-Howard
 While the third one was not a show business figure, TV personality David Frost and actor Patrick Ryecart married daughters of Miles Fitzalan-Howard, 17th Duke of Norfolk, whose granddaughter is playwright Kinvara Balfour.

Fleeshman
 Actor David Fleeshman and actress Sue Jenkins are the parents of actors Richard, Emily and Rosie Fleeshman.

Fleischer
 Cartoonists Dave and Max Fleischer were brothers; Max's son was director Richard Fleischer.

Flynn
 Actor Errol Flynn was the father of actor/journalist Sean Leslie Flynn and grandfather of actor Sean Flynn (born Sean Rio Amir) through his daughter, Rory Flynn.

Fogerty
 Musicians John and Tom Fogerty are brothers and members of Creedence Clearwater Revival.

Followill
 The alternative rock band Kings of Leon is made up of brothers Nathan, Caleb, and Jared Followill, along with their first cousin Matthew Followill.
 Nathan is married to singer-songwriter, Jessie Baylin.
 Caleb is married to model, Lily Aldridge (see Aldridge).
 Matthew is married to singer-songwriter, Johanna Bennett. She was once the partner of Alex Turner of the band The Arctic Monkeys.

Fonda
 Actor Henry Fonda was father of actress Jane Fonda and actor Peter Fonda
Jane was married to director Roger Vadim, political activist Tom Hayden, and media mogul Ted Turner; she and Hayden are parents of actor Troy Garity;
Peter is father of actress Bridget Fonda, who married musician Danny Elfman (see above, "Elfman acting-composing family")

Ford
 Glenn Ford was married to Eleanor Powell (1943–1959); the father of actor Peter Ford.

Fox
 Theatrical agent Robin Fox married actress Angela Worthington, daughter of playwright Frederick Lonsdale. Their children were actors Edward and James Fox and producer Robert Fox.
 Edward was married to actress Tracy Reed, and later to actress Joanna David. Edward and Joanna are the parents of actors Emilia and Freddie Fox.
 Emilia was married to actor Jared Harris, son of actor Richard Harris.
 Robert was married to actress Natasha Richardson (see Redgrave).
 James is the father of actors Laurence, Jack and Lydia Fox.
 Laurence was married to actress Billie Piper.
 Lydia is married to actor and comedian Richard Ayoade.

Foxworth
 Actor, Robert Foxworth, is the son of Erna Beth (née Seaman), a writer. Robert was married to Marilyn McCormick, who had son and actor, Bo Foxworth and daughter, actress, Kristyn Foxworth. Robert was then married to actress, Elizabeth Montgomery (see Montgomery).
 Bo is married to actress, Wendy Kaplan.

Francis-Frakes
 Actor-director Jonathan Frakes is married to soap opera star Genie Francis, who is the daughter of Ivor Francis.

Francks
 Actor and musician Don Francks and wife Lili Francks are the parents of actress Cree Summer and actor Rainbow Sun Francks.

Franklin
 Musician Aretha Franklin often recorded her music with her two sisters Erma Franklin and Carolyn Franklin, who were solo singers in their own right, brother Cecil Franklin was a singer as was their father, the Reverend C.L. Franklin.

Freud
 Late politician, broadcaster and writer Sir Clement Freud, grandson of Sigmund Freud, was married to director and actress June Flewett and had five children, including public relations executive Matthew and broadcaster and presenter Emma Freud. Sir Clement's niece, novelist and screenwriter Esther Freud, is married to actor David Morrissey.
 Matthew was married to Elisabeth Murdoch, daughter of media magnate Rupert Murdoch
 Emma is the partner of screenwriter and producer Richard Curtis

Frith
Musicians Mishka and Heather Frith (aka Heather Nova) are brother and sister.

Froese
 Composer-musician Edgar Froese is the father of fellow performer Jerome Froese, who works with him as part of Tangerine Dream.

Frye-Peluce-Goldberg
 Actor Virgil Frye was the father of actors Sean Frye and Soleil Moon Frye (the latter married TV producer Jason Goldberg) and stepfather of actor Meeno Peluce, whose mother Sondra Peluce Londy is Sean and Soleil's mother.

G
Gaillard-Gaye
 Cuban jazz musician, Slim Gaillard, is the father of singer-actress, Janis Hunter, later to be known as Janis Gaye upon her marriage to singer, Marvin Gaye.
 Before they married, Marvin and Janis became the parents of future singer and actress, Nona Gaye.
 Marvin has a musical brother in singer, Frankie Gaye.

Gainsbourg
 French singer, songwriter, composer, actor and director Serge Gainsbourg is the father of English-French singer and actress Charlotte Gainsbourg.

Garcia
 Actor, Andy García, is the father of Dominik Garcia-Lorido, an actress. Both starred as father and daughter in City Island.

Garland-Minnelli
 Judy Garland (born Frances Ethel Gumm) married film director Vincente Minnelli as her second husband, and they were the parents of actress Liza Minnelli; Garland's third husband was producer Sidney Luft, and by him was mother of cabaret singer Lorna Luft.

Gastineau
 NFL football player Mark Gastineau was formerly married to reality star Lisa Gastineau. They are the parents of model and reality star Brittny Gastineau.

Gauguin
 Sculptor, Paul Gauguin, is the father of footballer, Emil Gauguin, artist, Jean Gauguin, and painter, Pola Gauguin.
 Jean's second wife was cartoonist Sys Poulsen. Their daughter is television writer and author, Lulu Gauguin.
 Lulu was married to jazz pianist, Adrian Bentzon. With him she is the mother of jazz musician, Aske Bentzon. She is also the mother of singer, Alberte Winding (see Winding) with actor, Thomas Winding.
 Alberte was married to musician, Jan Rørdam. She is now married to musician, Andreas Fuglebæk.
 Pola is the father of painter, Paul Rene Gauguin.
 Paul's second wife was actress, Bonne Winther-Hjelm Jelstrup.

Geldof-Yates
 Singer-songwriter Bob Geldof is the father of broadcaster, journalist and model Peaches Geldof and model Pixie Geldof by his ex-wife music journalist and presenter Paula Yates, who subsequently married singer Michael Hutchence. Yates is the biological daughter of television host Hughie Green but was raised by presenter and producer Jess Yates and his wife actress Elaine Smith as their own.
 Peaches was married to S.C.U.M lead singer Thomas Cohen. She was married to Chester French musician, Max Drummey.

Gélin
 French actor, Daniel Gélin, married actress, Danièle Delorme (born Gabrielle Danièle Marguerite Andrée Girard) (see Girard). They have son and actor, Xavier Gélin. Daniel had an affair with model, Marie Christine Schneider, that produced daughter and actress, Maria Schneider. He also has daughter and actress, Fiona Gélin (born Bénédicte) from a later marriage.

George-De Mornay-O'Neal
 TV host Wally George was the father of actress Rebecca De Mornay, who is married to sportscaster Patrick O'Neal, son of actor Ryan O'Neal.

George-White
 Rat Patrol star Christopher George was the uncle of Wheel of Fortune co-hostess Vanna White and was the husband of actress- TV personality Linda Day- George.

Gibb
 The Bee Gees were brothers Barry, Robin and Maurice Gibb. Their younger brother Andy Gibb was a successful recording artist in his own right.
 Barry's son Steve Gibb is a rock guitarist and singer.
 Maurice was married to singer Lulu

Gibbs-Garrett
 Marla Gibbs and Susie Garrett, both television actresses, were sisters.

Gilbert
 Actresses Melissa and Sara are sisters. Melissa was married to actor Bruce Boxleitner.

Girard
 Painter, André Girard, is the father of actress, Danièle Delorme (born Gabrielle Danièle Marguerite Andrée Girard), and three other daughters.
 Delorme married actor, Daniel Gélin (see Gélin), with whom she had a son and actor, Xavier Gélin. She then married actor and filmmaker, Yves Robert (see Robert).
 André's daughter, Evie, married pianist, Jean Casadesus (see Casadesus).

Gish
 Actresses Lillian and Dorothy Gish were famous sisters in Hollywood's early days. Dorothy married actor James Rennie.

Gallagher
 Noel and younger brother Liam are members of rock band Oasis. Nicole Appleton and Patsy Kensit have had children by Liam.

Glass
 Composer Philip Glass's cousin Ira Glass is radio host and creator of This American Life.

Gleason-Miller
 Actor Jackie Gleason's daughter Linda married actor Jason Miller; their son, Jackie's grandson, is actor Jason Patric (full name: Jason Patrick Miller Junior).

Gleeson
 Actor Brendan Gleeson is the father of actors Domnhall and Brian Gleeson.

Glenister
 Director John Glenister is the father of actors Philip Glenister and Robert Glenister.

Gold
 Actor-turned-talent agent Harry Gold is the father of actresses Tracey, Missy, Brandy and Jessie Gold.

Gold-Nixon
 Oscar-winning composer Ernest Gold and his first wife, singer Marni Nixon, are the parents of singer-songwriter-producer Andrew Gold.

Goldwyn (Howard-Goldwyn)
 Samuel Goldwyn's son, Samuel Goldwyn, Jr., was married to Jennifer Howard (daughter of Sidney Howard). Sam Jr. and Jennifer's sons are actors John and Tony Goldwyn.

Gomez
 Producer Roberto Gomez Fernandez is the son of actor/comedian/director Roberto Gomez Bolanos and nephew of actor/producer Horacio Gomez Bolanos

Gooding

 Singer Cuba Gooding is father of actors Cuba Gooding, Jr. and Omar Gooding

Gordy-Ross-Naess
 Music producer and Motown founder Berry Gordy is the younger brother of songwriter and composer Anna Gordy Gaye, the first wife of singer Marvin Gaye. He is the father of musician Kennedy Gordy, better known as Rockwell, from a relationship with Margaret Norton, and actress Rhonda Ross Kendrick from another relationship with singer Diana Ross, and rapper/musician Stefan Gordy (Redfoo) from a relationship with writer-producer Nancy Leiviska.
 Ross is the mother of actress Tracee Ellis Ross from her marriage to Robert Ellis Silberstein, and actor Evan Ross
 Næss was the father of singer-songwriter Leona Naess from his previous marriage to Filippa Kumlin D'Orey.

Gould
 Actors Alexander, Emma and Kelly Gould are all siblings.

Gray
 Beatrice Gray was the mother of Father Knows Best star (and motorcyclist) Billy Gray.

Griffin-Haid
 Actor Charles Haid and talk show-host and TV producer Merv Griffin are cousins.

Grimes
 Actress Camryn Grimes of The Young and the Restless is the niece of actor Scott Grimes.

Groves-Roper
 Victorian stage actor Charles Groves was a father to Fred Groves, a leading actor of British silent films, and a brother to Walter Groves of the Fred Karno Company. Henry Groves, a brother to Charles and Walter, is the great-grandfather of Linda Groves, who married the comedian George Roper. Roper himself was the great-nephew of the Music Hall comedians Johnnie Cullen and George Sanford and a first cousin once removed of the wartime singer Jeannie Bradbury. His son Matt Roper is an actor and comedian.

Gunn
 James Gunn, film director, screenwriter, and novelist is brothers with actor Sean, screen and television writer Brian, political entertainer Matt, and film executive Patrick Gunn. They are cousins with television and screenwriter Mark Gunn. In 2000, James Gunn married actress Jenna Fischer; the couple later divorced.
 Note the family is not related to television personality Tim Gunn

Guthrie-Irion
 Folk singer-songwriter Woody Guthrie was the father of fellow folk singer-songwriter Arlo Guthrie.
 Arlo in turn is the father of singer-songwriter Sarah Lee Guthrie, who performs with her husband as Sarah Lee Guthrie & Johnny Irion.

Gwynne-Gilford-Pine
Actress Anne Gwynne was the mother of Gwynne Gilford
Actress Gwynne Gilford married Actor Robert Pine and are the parents of actor Chris Pine.

Gyllenhaal-Foner
 Actors Maggie Gyllenhaal and Jake Gyllenhaal are the children of director Stephen Gyllenhaal and writer Naomi Foner. Maggie is married to actor Peter Sarsgaard.

H
Hagen
 Scriptwriter Hans Hagen (also known as Hans Oliva), and actress Eva-Maria Hagen are the parents of punk rock singer Nina Hagen. Eva-Maria was later married to Wolf Biermann, a singer-songwriter.
 Nina's daughter Cosma Shiva Hagen is an actress.

Hale
 Alan Hale, Sr. married actress Gretchen Hartmann and they were the parents of Alan Hale, Jr.

Hall
 Sir Peter Hall is a theatre and film director. His children are Emma Hall (from his fourth marriage to theatre publicist Nichola Frei); actress Rebecca (from his third marriage to opera singer Maria Ewing), director Edward and theatre designer Lucy Hall (both from his second marriage to his assistant Jacqueline Taylor); producer Christopher and painter/actress/singer-songwriter Jennifer (both from his first marriage to actress Leslie Caron; Caron was previously married to musician Geordie Hormel and subsequently to American producer/director Michael Laughlin).
Edward is married to comedian Issy van Randwyck
Jennifer is married to producer and screenwriter Glenn Wilhide
Christopher is married to Hon. Jane Studd, formerly a third assistant director, and their son Freddie Hall is a second assistant director while his younger brother Ben Hall is training to become an actor.

Hallyday/Smet-Vartan-Scotti
 French singer and actor Jean-Philippe Smet, better known by his stage name of Johnny Hallyday, and his first wife, French singer Sylvie Vartan, are the parents of singer David Hallyday (born David Smet). Johnny is the father of actress Laura Smet from a later relationship with actress Nathalie Baye.
 David was married to French supermodel Estelle Lefébure.
 Sylvie's current husband is American actor and music producer Tony Scotti, cofounder of Scotti Brothers Records Ben Scotti.
 Sylvie's brother Eddie Vartan, a music producer, is the father of French-American actor Michael Vartan.

Hamilton-Stewart
 Actor, George Hamilton, is the son of musician, George Hamilton. His elder half-brother, William Potter, became an interior decorator for such prestigious firms as Eva Gabor Interiors.
 George, Jr. was married to actress and model, Alana Stewart (see Stewart). They are the parents of fellow actor, Ashley Hamilton.
 Ashely was married to actresses, Shannen Doherty and Angie Everhart.
 Joe Pesci was also once married to Claudia Haro, a model and actress.
 Alana Stewart later married singer, Rod Stewart. They are the parents of model, Kimberly Stewart, and reality TV personality, Sean Stewart.
 Kimberly Stewart has a daughter with actor Benicio del Toro (see del Toro).

Hammerstein
 Theatrical impresario Oscar Hammerstein I is the grandfather of lyricist Oscar Hammerstein II.

Hanks-Wilson
 Actor, Tom Hanks's son by his first marriage, to actress Samantha Lewes†, is actor Colin Hanks. Tom Hanks's second wife is actress and producer, Rita Wilson.

Hanley
 Actor, Jimmy Hanley, married actress, Dinah Sheridan, with whom he has three children. Their children include actress, Jenny Hanley, and politician, Sir Jeremy Hanley.
 Dinah later married business executive, John Davis. She then married actor, John Merivale (see Merivale).
 Jeremy married Verna, Viscountess Villiers.
 Verna was previously married to the royal, George Henry Child Villiers, Viscount Villiers (see Villiers).

Hanson
 Hanson is an American pop-rock band from Tulsa, Oklahoma formed by brothers Isaac (guitar, piano, vocals), Taylor (keyboards, piano, guitar, drums, vocals), and Zac Hanson (drums, piano, guitar, vocals).

Hardin
 Actor Jerry Hardin is the father of fellow actress Melora Hardin.

 Hardwicke
 Actor Cedric Hardwicke was the father of actor Edward Hardwicke.

Hargitay/Mansfield
 Actor Mickey Hargitay and wife Jayne Mansfield were the parents of actress Mariska Hargitay, who is married to actor Peter Hermann.
 Actor Eddie Hargitay is Mickey's nephew.

Harmon
 Football player and sports broadcaster Tom Harmon and actress Elyse Knox are the parents of painter and actress Kristin, actress and model Kelly and actor Mark Harmon.
 Kristin was previously married to singer and musician Ricky Nelson, son of Ozzie and Harriet Nelson (see Nelson family). They have four three children: actress Tracy, twins and members of Nelson Gunnar and Matthew and musician Sam.
Tracy was married to actor William R. Moses.
Mark is married to actress Pam Dawber and they have two sons.

Harper-Schaal
 Actress Valerie Harper was the second wife of actor Richard Schaal, whose daughter by his first wife is actress Wendy Schaal.

Harrison
 Beatle George Harrison is the father of musician Dhani Harrison.

Harrison
 Actor Rex Harrison was the father of actor/singer Noel Harrison and (with actress and writer Lilli Palmer) novelist and dramatist Carey Harrison.
 Noel was the father of actress Cathryn Harrison.

Hart
 This Canadian professional wrestling family was founded by wrestler, trainer, and promoter Stu Hart and his wife, promoter Helen Hart. They had 12 children; Smith, Bruce, Keith, Wayne, Dean, Ellie, Georgia, Bret, Alison, Ross, Diana, and Owen. All of their sons were mainly wrestlers except for Wayne, who was mainly a referee.
 Smith has two son whom are pro wrestlers, Mike and Matt.
 Bruce also has two sons whom have wrestled at some point, Torrin and Bruce Jr.
 Keith has a son named Conor whom pursued amateur wrestling in high school.
 Ellie and her former husband, wrestler Jim Neidhart, have three daughters. One of them, Nattie Neidhart, is a wrestler and is married to wrestler TJ Wilson.
 Georgia and her husband, wrestler B. J. Annis, have four children. One of them, Teddy Annis, wrestles as Teddy Hart.
 Bret's former sister-in-law was married to wrestler Tom Billington, better known as Dynamite Kid. Billington was also the first cousin of Davey Boy Smith.
 Alison's former husband is wrestler Ben Bassarab. One of their daughters, Brook, is married to pro wrestler Pete Wilson. Their other daughter, Lindsay has dated wrestler Randy Myers and does make up for the wrestling reality show Total Divas.
 Diana and her former husband Davey Boy Smith, Dynamite Kid's cousin and a wrestler, had two children. One of them, Harry Smith, is a wrestler as well.

Hauser
 see Warner-Hauser-Sperling

Hawks
 Director Howard Hawks's first wife, Athole Shearer, was a sister of actress Norma Shearer, wife of producer Irving Thalberg. Hawks's second wife, Slim Keith, later married theatrical producer Leland Hayward. Hawks's third wife, Dee Hartford, had a sister, Eden Hartford who married Groucho Marx of the Marx Brothers. Hawks's brother, Kenneth Neil Hawks, was the first husband of actress Mary Astor. Howard Hawks's daughter, Kitty Hawks, was the former wife of Ned Tanen.

Hawkes
 Len 'Chip' Hawkes, bassist from The Tremeloes, is the father of singer Chesney

Hawn-Russell-Hudson
 Goldie Hawn and longtime partner Kurt Russell; from her second marriage to Hudson Brothers's Bill Hudson, Goldie is mother of actors Kate Hudson, who was married to Black Crowes' frontman Chris Robinson, and Oliver Hudson, who is married to actress Erinn Bartlett; Kurt Russell was married to actress Season Hubley, whose brother is actor Whip Hubley. William Hudson was married to actress Cindy Williams.

Haworth
Joseph Haworth 19th century actor and William Haworth (19th–20th century writer, actor, director): Ted Haworth (son of William Haworth), production designer/art director; Sean Haworth (son Ted Haworth), art director; Martha Haworth (daughter William Howarth), married to actor Wallace Ford.

Hawtrey
Sir Charles Hawtrey was the father of actor/director Anthony Hawtrey. Other theatrical members are actors Nicholas and Kay Hawtrey, who was married to actor/director John Clark.

Hemingway
 Author Ernest Hemingway was the grandfather of actresses Mariel Hemingway and Margaux Hemingway.
Mariel is the mother of model and actress Dree Hemingway.

Hemsworth
 Brothers and actors Luke Hemsworth, Chris Hemsworth, and Liam Hemsworth. Chris Hemsworth is married to Spanish actress Elsa Pataky and Liam Hemsworth was married to American singer Miley Cyrus.

Henson (I)
 Muppets creator Jim Henson was the father of filmmakers Brian, Cheryl, Heather, and Lisa Henson.
 Note: No relation to Henson (II)

Henson (II)
 Comedian Leslie Henson was the father of actor Nicky Henson and farmer and T.V presenter Joseph Henson. Nicky was married to actress Una Stubbs; their sons were composers Christian Henson, best known as the composer of the themes to Top Gear and Two pints of lager and a packet of crisps and Joe Henson. Their cousin is Adam Henson, whose father was Joseph Henson.

Hester
 Singer-songwriter Benny Hester is the father of film and television composer Eric Hester.

Hewlett
 Actor David Hewlett is the brother of actress Kate Hewlett. David was married to actress Soo Garay.

Hepburn-Ferrer
 Actors Audrey Hepburn and Mel Ferrer were the parents of film producer Sean Hepburn Ferrer.

Hilton
 Socialite Kathy Hilton is the mother of socialites and celebutantes Paris Hilton and Nicky Hilton. Kathy's half-sisters Kim Richards and Kyle Richards, are actresses.

Ho (Tai-Loy)
 Impresario Don Ho was the father of fellow singer-musician Hoku (full name: Hoku Christianne Tai-Loy).

 Holland
 Comedian and writer Dominic Holland is the father of actor Tom Holland.

 Holloway
 Actor and Singer Stanley Holloway was the father of actor Julian Holloway.
Julian is the father of former model and author Sophie Dahl, whose maternal grandfather is children's author Roald Dahl.

Houghton-Hepburn-Grant
 Actress Katharine Hepburn was the aunt of actress Katharine Houghton, who is the aunt of actress Schuyler Grant.

Houston-Drinkard-Warwick-Brown
 Singers Cissy Houston and Lee Drinkard (members of the Drinkard Singers), aunts of singers Dionne Warwick & Dee Dee Warwick, Cissy's daughter is pop diva Whitney Houston, who was married to singer Bobby Brown.

Howard (Horowitz)
 Actor-brothers Moe, Shemp (real name: Samuel) and Curly Howard (real name: Jerome) were all members of the Three Stooges.

Howard
 Actor-director Rance Howard and his wife, actress Jean Speegle Howard, are the parents of actor-director Ron Howard and character actor Clint Howard.
 Ron is the father of actresses Paige and Bryce Dallas Howard.
 Bryce is married to actor Seth Gabel.

Howes
 Comedian, actor, singer and variety star Bobby Howes and actress/singer Patricia Malone are the parents of actor Sally Ann Howes and clarinettist Peter Howes.

Hulbert
 Actors Claude Hulbert and Jack Hulbert were brothers. Jack Hulbert was married to actress Cicely Courtneidge for 62 years.

Humperdinck-Hues
 Martial arts-actor Matthias Hues is the great-grandson of opera-composer Engelbert Humperdinck, who authored (among others) Hansel and Gretel.

Huston
 Actor Walter Huston was the father of actor and director John Huston.
 John in turn was the father of actress Anjelica Huston and actor and director Danny Huston. Danny was previously married to Virginia Madsen, sister of Michael Madsen.

Hutton
 Timothy Hutton is the son of actor Jim Hutton, who was popular during the 1960s and 1970s. His first wife was actress Debra Winger, with whom he has one son, Noah. His second wife was Aurore Giscard d'Estaing, niece of former president of the French Republic Valéry Giscard d'Estaing, and with whom he has one son, Milo.

I
Ifans
Actors Rhys Ifans and Llŷr Ifans are brothers. Llŷr is married to TV presenter Lisa Gwilym.

Iglesias
 Singer, Julio Iglesias, is the father of journalist, Chabeli Iglesias, model and singer, Julio Iglesias Jr., and singer, Enrique Iglesias.

Inoue
 Seiyū, Kikuko Inoue, is the mother of seiyū, Honoka Inoue.

Irons
 Actor, Jeremy Irons, is married to actress, Sinéad Cusack (see Cusack), and they have two sons, actor, Max, and photographer and former actor, Samuel.
 Sinéad also has biological son and politician, Richard Boyd Barrett, whom was given up for adoption.

Irving
 Actress, Priscilla Pointer, and director, Jules Irving, are the parents of actress, Amy, director, David, and singer, Katie Irving.
 Amy was married to film director, Steven Spielberg (see Spielberg).

Irving
 Actor Sir Henry Irving was the father of actors Harry Brodribb Irving and Laurence Sydney Brodribb Irving.
 Harry was the father of set designer and art director Laurence Irving and actress Elizabeth Irving.

Isley
 Brothers, musicians, and singers, O'Kelly Isley, Rudolph Isley, Ronald Isley, Ernie Isley, Marvin Isley and brother-in-law, Chris Jasper were the members of the singing group, The Isley Brothers. Some members of the family still perform under that name. Another brother, Vernon Isley, was originally a member, but was killed in a bicycle accident at age 13, before the group was known outside of their hometown of Cincinnati.

Iwamatsu
 Actor, Mako, and his sister, Momo Yashima, an actress, are children of artist-author parents, Taro Yashima (Jun Atsushi Iwamatsu) and Mitsu Yashima.
 Mako was married to actress, Shizuko Hoshi. Their daughters, Mimosa and Sala Iwamatsu, are actresses.

J
Jackson
 Joseph Jackson, who had a brief and unsuccessful music career, and his wife Katherine Jackson founded an extremely successful musical family.
 Their first five sons (respectively their second, third, fourth, sixth, and eighth children in all)—Jackie, Tito, Jermaine, Marlon & Michael—formed the singing group The Jackson 5. Michael went on to even greater success as a solo artist, and was briefly married to Lisa Marie Presley, daughter of musical icon Elvis Presley. Jermaine is linked to the Gordy family through his former marriage to Hazel Gordy, the daughter of Motown founder Berry Gordy.
 Jackie is the father of rapper DealZ.
 The R&B vocal group 3T is made up of Tito's three sons (Tariano "Taj", Taryll, and Tito Joe "TJ" Jackson).
 Michael's son Prince Jackson began an acting career in 2013.
 Their oldest child, Rebbie Jackson, had a moderately successful career as a solo artist.
 Rebbie is the mother of singer Austin Brown.
 Marlon is the father of rapper Chye beats.
 Their fifth child and second daughter, La Toya Jackson, had modest success as a recording artist who received major publicity in 1988 when she landed a nude layout in Playboy.
 Their last son, Randy, replaced Jermaine in the Jackson 5 when it became The Jacksons.
 Their third son, Jermaine Jackson, was a solo artist at Motown.
 Their youngest child, Janet, began as a child actress and went on to a hugely successful career as a recording artist.

Jarre
 Composer Maurice Jarre is the father of screenwriter Kevin Jarre and musician Jean Michel Jarre. The latter was married to actress Charlotte Rampling – their son is the magician David Jarre – and is now married to actress Anne Parillaud.

Jenkins
 Writer/director Horace Jenkins was the father of filmmaker and artist Sacha Jenkins.

Jiminez-McCann-Brown
 Mexican voice artist Celia Jiminez was the mother of movie extra Celia McCann and film editor David McCann. David McCann is married to actress Leonell McCann
 Celia McCann is the mother of screenwriter Paul Brown and actress/comedian/singer, Julie Brown.

Johnson-Griffith 
Dakota Johnson is the daughter of actor Don Johnson and actress Melanie Griffith. 
Melanie Griffith is the daughter of actress Tippi Hedren.
Don Johnson's son Jesse Johnson from his previous marriage to actress Patti D'Arbanville, is also an actor. 
 
Jonas
 Kevin Jonas, Joe Jonas, and Nick Jonas are three brothers who have performed together as the band the Jonas Brothers as well as separately. Their youngest brother, Frankie Jonas, is an actor. Their father, Paul Kevin Jonas, Sr. is a songwriter.

Jones
 British rock icon David Bowie (born David Jones) was the father of British film director/producer Duncan Jones, with his first wife Angela Bowie. 
 Duncan Jones and his wife, photographer Rodene Ronquillo, have an infant son.
 David Bowie also fathered a daughter, Lexi, with his second wife, Somali supermodel and activist Iman.
 Iman was formerly married to NBA basketball player Spencer Haywood; they have a daughter, Zulekha Haywood
 Angela Bowie also has a daughter, Stacia Larranna Celeste Lipka, from her relationship with musician Drew Blood (real name Andrew Lipka)

Jones-Gretzky
The actress Janet Jones and husband hocker Wayne Gretzky and daughter singer Paulina Gretzky

Jones-Lipton
 Musician and producer, Quincy Jones, Jr., with ex-wife actress, Peggy Lipton (see Lipton), have two daughters: actress Rashida Jones and stylist Kidada Jones.
 Quincy also has a son named Quincy Jones, III, who is a composer and music producer with Swedish actress, Ulla Andersson.
 Quincy also has a daughter with the actress, Nastassja Kinski (see Kinski).
 Quincy's younger brother, Lloyd Jones, was a radio engineer for the Seattle station, KOMO-TV.

Judd
 The country music vocal duo The Judds were made up of mother Naomi Judd and daughter Wynonna Judd. Naomi is the mother of actress Ashley Judd.
Jugnot
The actor gérard jugnot and son actor Arthur jugnot and stepdaughter actress flavie péan

K

Kaplan-Kaye-Starr
 Organist Harvey Kaye of the Spiral Starecase was the father of singer Brenda K. Starr.  Both share the same birth surname, Kaplan.

Kardashian-Jenner
 Reality stars Kim Kardashian, Kourtney Kardashian, Khloe Kardashian, and Rob Kardashian are the children of reality star Kris Jenner and attorney Robert Kardashian. They also have two half sisters, model Kendall Jenner and reality star Kylie Jenner, from their mother's second marriage to Olympic gold medalist Caitlyn Jenner (formerly known as Bruce Jenner).
 Caitlyn Jenner is also father to reality star Brody Jenner and musician Brandon Jenner, from her second marriage to actress Linda Thompson.
 Kim Kardashian-West was first married to songwriter Damon Thomas, then professional basketball player Kris Humphries, and now rapper Kanye West, with whom she has four children.

Karns
 Actor Roscoe Karns was the father of actor Todd Karns.

Kasem
 TV presenter and voice actor Casey Kasem is the father of TV presenter and voice actor Mike and television and radio hostess Kerri.

Katz-Grey
 Comedian and musician Mickey Katz was the father of actor Joel Grey.
 Joel Grey is the father of actress Jennifer Grey.

Keaton
 Actor Joe Keaton married actress Myra Keaton. Their children were actors Buster Keaton, Harry Keaton, and Louise Keaton.
 Buster was married to actress Natalie Talmadge (see Talmadge).
Not related to actress, Diane Keaton (the stage name for Diane Hall).

Keitel
 Actor Harvey Keitel is the father of fellow actress Stella Keitel.

Keith
 Actor Robert Keith was the father of actor Brian Keith.

Kemp
 Actor and musician, Martin Kemp, is the brother of Gary Kemp (both members of Spandau Ballet), and the husband of Shirlie Holliman, one half of Pepsi & Shirlie.

Kendal
 Actor-manager Geoffrey Kendal is the father of actresses Jennifer and Felicity Kendal.

Kensit
 Jamie Kensit, founder-member of Eighth Wonder, is a sister of Patsy, who was famously married to Liam Gallagher (Oasis); Jim Kerr (Simple Minds) and Dan Donovan (Big Audio Dynamite).

Kidman
 Psychologist and biochemist, Antony Kidman, is the father of actress, Nicole Kidman, and television journalist, Antonia Kidman.
 Nicole was married to actor, Tom Cruise (see Mapother), and is currently married to country singer, Keith Urban.

King
 Pop band, KING is made up of four siblings. It began with five King siblings: Trillion, Marieangela "Queenie", Jazzy, Ruby, and Lucius. Jazzy and Ruby left in 2013 to form band, Blonde Electra, and eventually sister Jemima joined them.
 Marieangela "Queenie" married musician, Elijah Blue Allman (see Allman), son of Gregg Allman and Cher (see Bono).

Kinski
 Actor, Klaus Kinski, was married three times and has a child with each wife:
 With singer, Gislinde Kühlbeck, he has daughter and actress, Pola Kinski.
 With actress, Ruth Brigitte Tocki, he has daughter and actress, Nastassja Kinski.
 Nastassja married Egyptian filmmaker, Ibrahim Moussa, and they have two children together, including daughter, Sonja Kinski, who works as a model and actress. Nastassja then lived with musician, Quincy Jones (see Jones-Lipton), with whom he has a daughter.
 With Minhoi Geneviève Loanic he has son and actor, Nikolai Kinski.

Kirby
 Actor Bruce Kirby was father of late actor Bruno Kirby. (Their real names are Bruno Giovanni Quidaciolu Sr. and Jr.)

Kirkwood
 Actor James Kirkwood, Sr. was married to film actress Lila Lee. Their son, James Kirkwood, Jr. was an actor and playwright

Klemperer
 Composer/conductor Otto Klemperer and singer Johanna Geisler were the parents of actor/musician Werner Klemperer. Philologist and diarist Victor Klemperer is a relative.

Knowles
Beyoncé and Solange Knowles are the daughters of Mathew Knowles, who manages their careers. Beyoncé is married to producer Jay-Z.

Köfer
Actor Herbert Köfer was married three times
 son out of the first marriage is cinematographer Andreas Köfer
 second marriage was with actress Ute Boeden, the daughters Mirjam Köfer and Geertje Boeden are actresses too
 third marriage is too singer and actress Heike Köfer

Kohan-Noxon
 Comedy writer Buz Kohan and novelist Rhea Kohan are the parents of television writer/producers Jenji Kohan and David Kohan. Jenji Kohan is the creator, showrunner, and executive producer for Showtime's television series Weeds. She is married to Christopher Noxon, a non-show-business writer. His sister is Marti Noxon, another TV writer/producer.

Koppel
 Danish musicians, singers and composers Anders Koppel, Annisette Koppel, Herman David Koppel, Lone Koppel, Naja Rosa, Nikolaj Koppel and Thomas Koppel are closely related.

Kosugi
 Ninjitsu master-actor Sho Kosugi is the father of fellow martial arts-actors Kane and Shane Kosugi.

Kravitz-Roker-Bonet
 Filmmaker and TV news producer Sy Kravitz and actress Roxie Roker were the parents of musician Lenny Kravitz.
 Lenny and his former wife Lisa Bonet are the parents of actress Zoë Kravitz. Bonet is now married to actor Jason Momoa.

Krabbé
 Dutch actor Jeroen Krabbé is the father of radio and television presenter Martijn Krabbé

Kubrick
 Screenwriter-producer-director Stanley Kubrick was the father of composer-filmmaker Vivian Kubrick, who scored his movie Full Metal Jacket under the pseudonym Abigail Mead. Moreover, Christianne Harlan-Kubrick (Stanley's widow and Vivian's mother) is the sister of film producer Jan Harlan.

L
Lacey
 Actor Ronald Lacey was the father of fellow actors Jonathan and Rebecca Lacey.

Lachey
 Singer Nick Lachey is the brother of singer and actor, Drew Lachey.
 Nick was married to singer, Jessica Simpson (see Simpson). He then married television personality, television host, fashion model, and actress, Vanessa Minnillo.
 Drew married high school sweetheart and dancer and choreographer, Lea Lachey.

Lai
 Actress Gigi Lai is the granddaughter of Hong Kong movie pioneer Lai Man-Wai.

Lamas
 Actors Fernando Lamas and Arlene Dahl are the parents of fellow actor (and martial artist) Lorenzo Lamas.

Lamb
 Actors, TV and radio personalities Sandy, Jan and Jerry Lamb are the nephew/niece of fellow actor Ti Lung. Jan is married to singer Cass Phang

Lancaster
 Actor Burt Lancaster was the father of actor Bill Lancaster.

Landau-Bain-Finch
 Actors Martin Landau and Barbara Bain are the parents of fellow actress Juliet Landau, and of producer Susan Finch.

Landis
 Movie writer Max Landis is the son of director John Landis.

Lawford
Actor Peter Lawford was the father of actor Christopher Lawford.

Lawrence
 Actors Joey Lawrence, Matthew Lawrence, and Andrew Lawrence are all brothers.

Lawrence
 Guy and Howard Lawrence are brothers who perform together as Disclosure.

Lee (Chinese)
 Cantonese opera singer and actor, Lee Hoi-Chuen, was the father of actor and martial arts expert, Bruce Lee.
 Bruce was the father of fellow actors Brandon and Shannon Lee.
No relation to musician, Tommy Lee, or to soap opera actress, Anna Lee.

Lee (American)
 Tommy Lee, born Thomas Lee Bass, is the son of Vassiliki Papadimitriou (Greek: Βασιλική Παπαδημητρίου), a 1957 Miss Greece contestant. His younger sister is musician, Athena Lee (Athena Michelle Bass). Tommy's second wife was actress, Heather Locklear (see Sambora). He then married actress and Playboy Playmate, Pamela Anderson. They have two sons including model and musician Dylan Jagger Lee and actor, model and reality star Brandon Thomas Lee. Tommy was engaged to singer Sofia Toufa and is now married to social media personality  Brittany Furlan.
 Athena was married to James Kottak, the drummer for the band Scorpions, and she was also the drummer of his solo band, KrunK.
No relation to martial artist, Lee Hoi-Chuen, or to soap opera actress, Anna Lee.

Lee (American)
 Musician Bill Lee is the father of filmmakers Spike, David, Joie and Cinqué Lee. He is also the uncle of filmmaker Malcolm D. Lee.

Lee (English)
 Soap opera actress Anna Lee was the adopted daughter of Sherlock Holmes creator Sir Arthur Conan Doyle.
Anna's children are fellow actors Tim Stafford (AKA Jeffrey Byron) and Venetia Stevenson, the latter of whom was married to singer Don Everly.
Venetia and Don have three children: Stacy, Erin and Edan Everly.
No relation to martial artist, Lee Hoi-Chuen, or to musician, Tommy Lee.

Lee-Field
 American Civil War general, Robert E. Lee, is the distant relative of actress, Auriol Lee.
 Auriol is the aunt of actress, Virginia Field.
 Virginia married actor, Paul Douglas. She then married actor, Willard Parker. Finally, she married composer, Howard Grode.
 Paul later married actress, Jan Sterling.
 Jan was previously married to actor, John Merivale (see Merivale). Jan's sister, Ann "Mimi" Adriance, was a model and businesswoman.

Leitch
 Impresario Donovan Leitch is the father of actors Donovan Leitch and Ione Skye (Leitch). Skye's first husband was Adam Horovitz of the Beastie Boys.

Lennon
 John Lennon was the father of musician Julian Lennon by his first marriage, and musician Sean Lennon by his second marriage to artist/singer Yoko Ono.

Lennon Sisters
 Sisters Dianne Lennon, Peggy Lennon, Kathy Lennon and Janet Lennon were featured performers on The Lawrence Welk Show.

Leonetti-Robbins-Beck-Hilton
 Actors Tommy Leonetti and Cindy Robbins are the parents of actress Kimberly Beck, who was married to hotel-heir William Barron Hilton, Junior. (Kim's current husband, since 1988, is producer and fellow actor Jason Clark.)

Lewis-Gilley-Swaggart-Brown
 Rock pioneer Jerry Lee Lewis is the brother of singer and pianist Linda Gail Lewis. They are cousins of country musician Mickey Gilley and disgraced televangelist Jimmy Swaggart. Another first cousin to the Lewis siblings, J.W. Brown, was the bass guitarist in Lewis' band.
 Brown's daughter Myra Gale Brown became Jerry Lee's third wife. Their daughter, Phoebe Lewis, is a musician and her father's manager.

Lipton
 Model, Peggy Lipton, is the sister of actor, Robert Lipton. She married Quincy Jones (see Jones) and has actress daughters, Rashida Jones and Kidada Jones.

Lithgow
 Sarah and Arthur Lithgow are the parents of actor John Lithgow, who is the father of actor Ian Lithgow.

Livesey 
 Actor Sam Livesey was the father of actors Jack Livesey and Barry Livesey. His nephew and stepson was actor Roger Livesey who were also their cousins/stepbrothers.

Lloyd-Pack
 Actor Charles Lloyd-Pack was the father of actor Roger Lloyd-Pack and grandfather of actress Emily Lloyd.

Lloyd Webber
 William Lloyd Webber is the father of Andrew Lloyd Webber English composer of musical theatre and Julian Lloyd Webber, English cellist; Andrew is the father of Imogen Lloyd Webber, English theatre producer. Andrew Lloyd Webber was formerly married to singer/actress Sarah Brightman.

Lockhart
 Actors Gene and Kathleen Lockhart are the parents of fellow actress June Lockhart, who is the mother of fellow actress Anne Lockhart.

Loggins
 Singer-songwriters Dave Loggins and Kenny Loggins are cousins.
 Kenny is the father of singer Crosby Loggins.

López
 Cuban musicians Orestes López and Israel "Cachao" López were brothers.
 Orestes's son, bassist Cachaito López, became famous in his last years for his work with Buena Vista Social Club.

Lowe-Swank
 Actor Rob Lowe is the brother of Chad Lowe, who was married to fellow actress Hilary Swank.

Lupino
 Actor/Director Ida Lupino was a member of the Lupino Family.

Lynch (Shane)
 Shane, Keavy, Edele, Naomi, and Tara Lynch are siblings who have all had singing careers. (Keavy and Edele as part of Irish band, B*Witched.)
 Shane married Easther Bennett, lead singer of Eternal. He then married singer, Sheena White.
 B*Witched bandmate and actress, Lindsay Armaou, was married to 911 lead singer, Lee Brennan.
Unrelated to screenwriter, David Lynch.

Lynch (David)
 Screenwriter-director, David Lynch, is the father of writer, Jennifer, who authored The Secret Diary of Laura Palmer to tie in with his hit series Twin Peaks.
Unrelated to the Irish Lynch musicians.

Lyte
 Anglican divine, hymn-writer, and poet, Henry Francis Lyte, is the father of chemist and photographer, Farnham Maxwell-Lyte.
 Henry's daughters are Emily Jeanette Maxwell-Lyte and Phillippa Massingberd Maxwell Lyte.
 Farnham's son is Cecil Henry Maxwell-Lyte.
 Emily's son is English historian and archivist, Henry Maxwell Lyte.
 Phillippa's son is British newspaper magnate and publisher, Sir Arthur Pearson, 1st Baronet (see Pearson).
 Cecil married Hon. Mary Lucy Agnes Stourton, daughter of Alfred Stourton, 23rd Baron Mowbray (see Stourton), 24th Baron Segrave.
 Arthur's second wife is humanitarian, Ethel Pearson. Their son is newspaper publisher, Neville Pearson.
 Neville first married Mary Angela Mond (see Mond). He later married actress, Gladys Cooper. His daughter with Gladys is Sally Pearson (aka Sally Cooper), who was married to actor, Robert Hardy.
 Gladys's daughter from her first marriage is Joan. After Neville, Gladys married actor, Philip Merivale (see Merivale).
 Joan married actor, Robert Morley (see Morley). Their daughter is writer and critic, Sheridan Morley.
 Sheridan's cousin is actress, Joanna Lumley. His godparents are dramatist, Sewell Stokes (see Stokes), and actor, Peter Bull (see Bull). Sheridan's son is Hugo.
 Hugo is one of actor, Noël Coward's (see Coward), many godchildren.

M
MacArthur
 Playwright Charles MacArthur was married to actress Helen Hayes. Their adopted son was actor James MacArthur.
 James married actress Joyce Bulifant (see Bulifant). He later married actress Melody Patterson (see Patterson). His third and last wife was former LPGA golfer Helen Beth Duntz.

MacMillan-Arngrim
 Thor and Norma MacMillan are the parents of actors Alison and Stefan Arngrim.

Madden
 Good Charlotte's lead singer, Joel Madden, is the twin brother of the band's lead guitarist, Benji Madden.
 Joel is married to reality star Nicole Richie (see Richie).
 Nicole is the adoptive daughter of R&B and soul singer Lionel Richie.
 Benji Madden is married to actress Cameron Diaz.

Mailer
 Novelist, Norman Mailer, has five sons: producer-screenwriter, Michael Mailer, actor, Stephen Mailer, and actor-screenwriter, John Buffalo Mailer. Michael is the son of his fourth wife and actress, Beverly Bentley. John is the son of his sixth wife and actress-novelist, Norris Church Mailer.

Mamet-Crouse
 Playwright-Screenwriter-Author David Mamet was married to actress Lindsay Crouse (daughter of playwright Russel Crouse). They are the parents of actress Zosia Mamet. Mamet is now married to singer-songwriter Rebecca Pidgeon and Crouse to television director/editor Rick Blue.

Mansfield-Duane
 NBC radio personality, Ronnie Mansfield, is the father of actress, Maureen Mansfield.
 Maureen is the mother of singer-songwriter, Christina Duane, and singer-songwriter, Erik Carlson.

Mansfield
 Actress Jayne Mansfield, was the mother of Mariska Hargitay and Jayne Marie Mansfield, who are both actresses.

Mantegna
 Actor, Joe Mantegna, is the father of actress, Gia Mantegna.

Marin
 Actor-comedian, Cheech Marin, is the father of actress, Rikki Marin.

Markham
 Actor David Markham was married to dramatist Olive Dehn and their children include actresses Kika and Petra Markham and poet and dramatist Jehane Markham
 Kika was married to the late Corin Redgrave (see Redgrave family) and is stepmother of actress Jemma Redgrave.
 Jehane is married to actor Roger Lloyd-Pack and her stepdaughter is actress Emily Lloyd.

Marley-Hill
 Musician Bob Marley was the father of Ziggy, Julian, Ky-Mani, Stephen, Damian and Rohan Marley. Rohan is in a long-term relationship with musician Lauryn Hill.

Marsh
 Actresses Mae Marsh and her older sister Marguerite Marsh were sisters

Marshall
 Director Garry Marshall brother of actress-director Penny Marshall who was married to Rob Reiner, son of Carl Reiner. Uncle of Rob and Penny's daughter Tracy Reiner.

Martin-Halliday-Hagman
 Actress Mary Martin was the mother of actor Larry Hagman, whose daughter Heidi Hagman is an actress. Martin was married at one time to theatrical director Richard Halliday.

Masekela
 South African jazz musician Hugh Masekela is the father of American TV host Sal Masekela.

Mason
 Actress, Pamela Mason, first married to cinematographer, Roy Kellino, later married actor, James Mason. They are the parents of child actress, Portland Mason, and Morgan Mason, a politician and film producer, who is married to Belinda Carlisle of the Go-Go's. James later remarried Australian actress, Clarissa Kaye.

Massey
 Actors, Raymond Massey and Adrianne Allen were the parents of actors Daniel Massey and Anna Massey, former wife of actor Jeremy Brett with whom she had two children.

McCarthy-Wahlberg
 Actress, Melissa McCarthy, married to actor Ben Falcone (see Falcone), is the cousin of actress and model, Jenny McCarthy, and her sister, professional basketball player, Joanne McCarthy.
 Jenny was married to actor, John Asher, (son of actor, Edward Mallory (see Mallory), and actress, Joyce Bulifant) lived with comedian and actor, Jim Carrey (see Carrey), and is now married to former New Kids on the Block band member and actor, Donnie Wahlberg. (see Wahlberg siblings).

McCartney
 The Beatles' member Paul McCartney is the father of photographer Mary McCartney, fashion designer Stella McCartney and musician James McCartney.

McGann
 Actors Joe, Paul, Mark and Stephen McGann are brothers.
 Stephen is married to screenwriter Heidi Thomas.
 Paul's children include musician Joseph McGann and actor Jake McGann.

McGarrigle
 See Wainwright/McGarrigle singing family.

McMahon / McMahon-Levesque
 Roderick "Jess" McMahon was co-founder of Capitol Wrestling Corporation, the company that eventually became today's World Wrestling Entertainment.
 His son Vincent J. McMahon, who succeeded Jess as the company's manager in 1953, took over ownership after Jess' death in 1954.
 WWE is currently run by Vincent J.'s son Vincent K. McMahon, who currently serves as chairman and CEO of the company. His wife Linda served as CEO from 1993 until 2009.
 Their son Shane McMahon served as WWE's Executive Vice President, Global Media until he left in 2010. Their daughter Stephanie McMahon-Levesque is WWE's Executive Vice President, Creative. Shane's wife Marissa Mazzola-McMahon is WWE's Director of National Public Relations and owns a film production company. Stephanie's husband is current WWE wrestler Paul Levesque, better known as Triple H.

McMillan
 Actor Kenneth McMillan was the father of actress Alison McMillan.

McQueen
 Actor Steve McQueen was the father of actor/martial artist/producer Chad McQueen. Chad's son is actor Steven R. McQueen (born Terence Steven McQueen II).

Mendelssohn-Itzig-Isserles-Meyerbeer
 Early Romantic composer Felix Mendelssohn was on his father's side a descendant of Haskalah Jewish philosopher Moses Mendelssohn, and on his mother's side a descendant of the Itzig family, which itself traced its ancestry to medieval Rabbi and talmudist Moses Isserles of Krakow, who himself was also a distant ancestor of grand opera composer Giacomo Meyerbeer.

Mercurio
 Actor Gus Mercurio was the father of dancer and actor Paul Mercurio.

Merivale
 Actor, Philip Merivale, was married to actress, Viva Birkett, with whom he has son and actor, John Merivale. Philip later married actress, Gladys Cooper.
 John married actress, Jan Sterling. Then married actress, Dinah Sheridan (see Hanley). He lived with actress, Vivien Leigh (see Olivier), until her death.
 Jan later married actor, Paul Douglas. Jan's sister, Ann "Mimi" Adriance, was a model and businesswoman.
 Paul was also married to actress, Virginia Field (see Lee).
 Gladys was first married to Captain Herbert Buckmaster, with whom she has daughter, Joan. Gladys then married Sir Neville Pearson (see Pearson), a British newspaper publisher. Together, they have one daughter, Sally Pearson (aka Sally Cooper).
 Joan married actor, Robert Morley. Their elder son, Sheridan Morley, became a writer and critic.
 Sally married actor, Robert Hardy.
 Sheridan's godparents are dramatist, Sewell Stokes (see Stokes), and actor, Peter Bull (see Bull). Sheridan has a son, Hugo. Ruth Leon, the critic and television producer, became Sheridan's second wife. Actress, Joanna Lumley, is a cousin of Sheridan's.
 Hugo is one of Noël Coward's (see Coward) many godchildren.

Merrill
 Singer, Helen Merrill, is the mother of singer-songwriter, Alan Merrill.

Michalka
 Carrie Michalka is a Christian musician and the mother of actresses and singers, Aly Michalka and AJ Michalka.
 Aly married independent film producer, Stephen Ringer.

Middleton
 Actor, Keith Middleton, married actress, model, and singer-songwriter, Toni Seawright, the first African American crowned Miss Mississippi. They are the parents of actors and singer-songwriters, Qaasim Middleton and Khalil Middleton (born Zuhri Khalil Ayele Mandara Middleton).

Miles
 Bernard Miles, actor, was the father of actress Sally Miles.

Miller (Arthur)
 Playwright, Arthur Miller, is the father of director and screenwriter, Rebecca Miller.
 Rebecca is married to actor, Daniel Day-Lewis (see Day-Lewis).
No relation to actors, Brian Miller or Jason Miller.

Miller (Brian)
 Actor, Brian Miller, and his late wife and actress, Elisabeth Sladen, are the parents of actress, Sadie Miller.
No relation to writer, Arthur Miller, or actor, Jason Miller.

Miller (Jason)
 Jason Miller, actor and playwright, was the father of actor Jason Patric, by Linda, the daughter of actor/director Jackie Gleason.
No relation to actor, Brian Miller, or playwright, Arthur Miller.

Miller (hip hop)
 Rapper, actor and entrepreneur Master P, and rappers and actors C-Murder and Silkk the Shocker (real names Percy, Corey and Vyshonne Miller) are all brothers. Their cousin is producer and rapper Mo B. Dick.
 Among Master P's children are rapper and actor Romeo Miller and singer and actress Cymphonique Miller.

Mills
 Actor, Sir John Mills and his wife and playwright, Mary Hayley Bell, are parents of actresses, Hayley Mills and Juliet Mills, and director, Jonathan Mills. Sir John's sister is actress, Annette Mills.
 Hayley Mills was married to director, Roy Boulting (see Boulting). Their son, Crispian Mills, leads the band, Kula Shaker. She has another son with British actor, Leigh Lawson (see Lawson). Her partner since 1997 is actor and writer, Firdous Bamji.
 Juliet Mills married actor, Maxwell Caulfield (see Caulfield). Their daughter is actress, Melissa Caulfield (born Melissa Miklenda from Juliet's first marriage). Juliet's godmother is actress, Vivien Leigh (see Olivier-Leigh), and her godfather is playwright, Noël Coward (see Veitch-Coward).
 Annette's granddaughter is actress, Susie Blake.
 Susie married actor, Martin Potter.

Mitchum-Van Dien
 Actors, Robert and Dorothy Mitchum, are the parents of actors, James, Chris, and Trini Mitchum. Robert's siblings, John and Julie Mitchum, are actors as well.
 Chris is the father of actors, Bentley and Carrie Mitchum.
 Carrie was married to actor, Casper Van Dien, who is the great-great-great nephew of author, Mark Twain. Casper and Carrie's children are actors, Cappy (born Casper Robert Van Dien 3rd) and Grace Van Dien. Casper is now married to actress Catherine Oxenberg, who is the daughter of Princess Elizabeth of Yugoslavia.
 Catherine was previously married to film producer, Robert Evans (see Evans).

Mitte-Carriere
 Actor, RJ Mitte, is the brother of fellow actress, Lacianne Carriere.

Miyazaki
 Animator and filmmaker and Hayao Miyazaki is the father of Gorō, an animator and filmmaker.

Moffatt
 Scott, Dave, Clint, and Bob Moffatt were a successful boy band from the 1990s to 2001

Morahan
 Director Christopher Morahan is married to actress Anna Carteret. They have two daughters: Rebecca, a theatre director, and Hattie, an actress.

Montalbán-Young
 Actor Ricardo Montalbán and his brother, actor Carlos Montalbán. Ricardo Montalbán was married to Georgiana Young; half-sister of actresses Loretta Young, Polly Ann Young and Sally Blane.

Montgomery
 Robert Montgomery, actor and director, married actress, Elizabeth Bryan Allen (see Allen). They are the parents of actress, Elizabeth Montgomery and actor, Robert Montgomery, Jr.
 Robert was born Henry Montgomery, Jr. to Henry Montgomery, Sr., the president of the New York Rubber Company.
 Elizabeth Montgomery's first marriage was to New York City socialite, Frederick Gallatin Cammann. She was later married to Academy Award winning actor, Gig Young (see Young). She then married producer, William Asher (see Asher), the son of producer, E.M. Asher. Film editor, Rebecca Asher, is their daughter. Her last husband was actor, Robert Foxworth.
 William Asher later married Joyce Bulifant (see Bulifant). He adopted actor, John Mallory Asher, Joyce's son with actor, Edward Mallory, as his own.
 Elizabeth Bryan Allen's sister is actress, Martha-Bryan Allen.

Moore
 Owen Moore was an early silent star along with his brothers Tom, Matt and Joe Moore. Tom Moore was married at one time to actress Alice Joyce.

Morales-Zerecero-Pierce
 Mexican actor Ruben Morales was married for most of the 1980s to actress/comedian Aida Pierce. Their son is actor Ruben Morales Zerecero (Zerecero is the family's actual name on his mother's side). Actress Lucia Zerecero is a relative of Pierce and Morales Zerecero.

Morrow
 Actor-director Vic Morrow was the father of producer Carrie Morrow and her younger sister, actress Jennifer Lee Morrow (better known as Jennifer Jason Leigh). Jennifer was formerly married to director and filmmaker Noah Baumbach.

Mortimer
 Barrister and creator of Rumpole of the Bailey Sir John Mortimer KC and his first wife journalist and novelist Penelope Mortimer (née Fletcher) are the parents of radio producer Jeremy Mortimer. Through Penelope's first marriage, John Mortimer is also stepfather to actress Caroline Mortimer. He later remarried Penelope Gollop and their daughter is actress Emily Mortimer.
Emily is married to actor Alessandro Nivola.

Mumy
 Actor Bill Mumy is the father of actors Seth and Liliana Mumy.

Muñoz
 Spanish flamenco guitarist Juan Muñoz is the father of Pilar, Lola, and Lucía Muñoz, the founding three members of the vocal group Las Ketchup; and Rocío Muñoz, who has later joined her sisters in the group.

Murray
 Actor-comedian Bill Murray and actors John, Joel and Brian Doyle-Murray are all brothers.

N
Narz-Kennedy
 Game show host Jack Narz is the older brother of fellow game show host Tom Kennedy (born James Narz). Jack and another game show host, Bill Cullen, went on to marry daughters of Oscar-winning composer Heinz Eric Roemheld.

Neame-Close
 Late actress Ivy Close and her first husband photographer Elwin Neame had two sons: producer and screenwriter Ronald Neame and author Derek Neame
Ronald's son is producer and screenwriter Christopher Neame.
Christopher's only son is award-winning producer Gareth Neame.

Nelson
 Bandleader-actor Ozzie Nelson and singer-actress Harriet Nelson (of The Adventures of Ozzie and Harriet fame) were the parents of actor-producer David Nelson and actor-singer Rick(y) Nelson.
Rick married artist Kristin Harmon, who is the daughter of former Heisman Trophy winner and sports broadcaster Tom Harmon and actress Elyse Knox. Kristin's younger brother is actor Mark Harmon, who is married to actress Pam Dawber.
Rick and Kristin are the parents of actress Tracy Nelson, who was married to actor Bill Moses, twins Gunnar and Matthew Nelson (of the band Nelson) and actor/musician Sam Nelson.

Neville
 The jazz-R&B group The Neville Brothers originally consisted of brothers Art, Aaron, Charles, and Cyril Neville.
Aaron's son Ivan Neville has regularly appeared with The Neville Brothers, as well as having his own solo career.

Newman
 Film composers Alfred, Emil, and Lionel Newman were brothers.
 Alfred's sons David and Thomas Newman are highly prolific film composers, and his daughter Maria Newman is a musician and composer.
 Randy Newman, a prolific film composer who is better known as a popular singer and songwriter, is the son of another Newman brother, Irving Newman.
 Joey Newman, a prolific film composer, is the son of Lionel's daughter Jenifer Newman, a classical ballerina, and Joe Frank Carollo, a bass guitarist best known as a member of Hamilton, Joe Frank & Reynolds.

Nichols
actress Nichelle Nichols is the mother of actor Kyle Johnson.

Niven
 David Niven was the father of David Niven, Jr.

Nolan
 The Nolans were a successful singing act in the late 1970s and early 1980s. The band's lineup changed through the years, but the members were all sisters. Members were Anne, Denise, Maureen, Linda, Bernadette, and Coleen

Norris
 Martial arts-actor/producer Chuck Norris is the brother of producer-director Aaron Norris. Chuck's sons are actors Eric and Mike Norris; he has a daughter, Dina, who is mother to actress Gabi Di Ciolli.

Norwood
 Willie Norwood is the father of R&B artists/actors Brandy and Ray J

O
O'Herlihy
 Actor, Dan O'Herlihy, was the brother of television director, Michael O'Herlihy.
 Dan's children are: architect, Lorcan O'Herlihy, fellow actors, Patricia, Cormac, and Gavan O'Herlihy (who is also an accomplished tennis player).
 Patricia's children are: Eilis O'Herlihy, fellow actor, Colin O'Herlihy, and artist/director/photographer, Micaela O'Herlihy.

O'Neal
 Actors, Ryan and Kevin O'Neal, are brothers. Ryan is the father of Oscar-winning actress, Tatum O'Neal, and actor, Griffin O'Neal, by his first wife, Joanna Moore. He is the father of former actor and current sports anchor, Patrick, by former wife, Leigh Taylor-Young.

Olivier
 Writer, Edith Olivier, is the sister of Sydney Olivier, 1st Baron Olivier, a British civil servant, and Herbert Arnould Olivier, an artist. They are the aunt and uncles of actor, Laurence Olivier.
 Sydney is the father of Hon. Margery Olivier, Hon. Brynhild Olivier, Hon. Daphne Olivier, and Hon. Noël Olivier, a socialite and doctor.
 Noël's daughter is author, Angela Richards.
 Laurence first married actress, Jill Esmond (see Esmond). Later, he married actress, Vivien Leigh. Finally, he married actress, Joan Plowright (see Plowright). With Esmond he has son and director, Tarquin Olivier. With Plowright he has son and director, Richard Olivier, actress, Tamsin Olivier, and actress, Julie Kate Olivier.
 Tamsin married actor, Simon Dutton.
 Simon was first married to actress, Betsy Brantley (see Brantley).
 Vivien's daughter from her first marriage is actress, Suzanne Farrington. Vivien later was the romantic partner of actor, John Merivale (see Merivale), for many years until her death.

Olsen
 Actress Ashley Olsen is the twin sister of actress, Mary-Kate Olsen, and sister of actress, Elizabeth Olsen.

Origliasso
 Lisa Origliasso and identical twin sister, Jessica Origliasso, are actresses, musicians, and fashion designers. They make up the duo pop group, The Veronicas. Their older brother, Julian Origliasso, is their manager and producer.

Orowitz-O'Neill-Landon
 American actor and movie theater manager Eli Orowitz and his wife, American actress and comedian Peggy O'Neill, were the parents of Eugene Orowitz, who achieved television fame under his stage name of Michael Landon.
 Michael had children in show business from each of his three marriages. Michael adopted the son of his first wife, who went on to become (late) actor Mark Landon. TV multihyphenate Michael Landon, Jr. and television screenwriter Christopher B. Landon are Michael's sons from his second marriage. Actress Jennifer Landon is from Michael's final marriage.

Ortiz de Pinedo
 Actor Oscar Ortiz de Pinedo was the father of actor/comedian/producer/director Jorge Ortiz de Pinedo and comedian/writer Oscar Ortiz de Pinedo. Jorge Ortiz de Pinedo's second wife was producer Luigina Tuccio, and Jorge's eldest son, Pedro, is also a producer.

Osbourne
 Rock and roller and 'Heavy Metal' pioneer Ozzy Osbourne and wife, television personality and agent Sharon Osbourne are the parents of actress, Aimee Osbourne, Fashion Police star, singer and actress Kelly Osbourne, and producer/director Jack Osbourne.
 From a previous marriage, Ozzy is the father of actress, Jessica Starshine Osbourne.
 Sharon is the daughter of music manager, Don Arden (see Arden-Osbourne).

Osment
 Former child actor, Haley Joel Osment, is the older brother of Disney Channel actress and singer, Emily Osment. Their father is actor, Michael Eugene Osment.

Osmond
 Actors/singers/television hosts Donny Osmond and Marie Osmond are brother and sister. Donny formerly sang with his brothers Alan, Wayne, Merrill and Jay as The Osmonds; younger brother 'Little' Jimmy Osmond later joined the group as well as having solo success. Some of the brothers still perform together as "The Osmond Brothers," while Alan's sons perform as "The Osmonds Second Generation."
 Those sons include: Michael Alan, Nathan George, Douglas Kenneth, David Levi, Scott Merrill, Jonathon Pinegar, Alexander Thomas, and Tyler James.
 Marie's daughter, Rachael Blosil, married Gabriel Krueger, a fashion designer.

Oswalt
 Comedian, Patton Oswalt was married to writer, Michelle Eileen McNamara, until her death in 2016. His brother is YouTube comedy writer, Matthew Oswalt.

Owens-Haggard-Alan
 Country singers Buck Owens and Bonnie Owens were the parents of another country singer, Alvis Alan Owens, professionally known as Buddy Alan. After Buck and Bonnie divorced while their son was growing up, she married another country singer, Merle Haggard; Alan stayed with his mother..

P
Paich
 Composer-musician Marty Paich is the father of musician-songwriter and session player David Paich, a founding member of Toto.

Palance
 Actor Jack Palance was the father of actress Holly Palance.

Palmer
 Actor, Geoffrey Palmer is father of director Charles Palmer, who is married to actress Claire Skinner.

Paltrow
 Producer, Bruce Paltrow, and his wife and actress, Blythe Danner, are parents of actress, Gwyneth Paltrow,
 She was wed to musician, Chris Martin of Coldplay.
 Blythe is the aunt and Gwyneth the cousin of The L Word actress, Katherine Moennig.

Parks
 Photographer and director Gordon Parks was the father of director Gordon Parks Jr.

Patterson
 Actress, Melody Patterson, is the daughter of Rosemary Wilson, an official in the Miss Universe contest and a dancer with Warner Bros. who doubled for Joan Crawford in several films. Melody was married to actor, James MacArthur (see MacArthur). Later, she married musician, Vern Miller.

Patton
 see Chuckle-Patton

Peck
 Actor, Gregory Peck, was the father of actors, Cecilia and Tony Peck, and grandfather of Ethan Peck.

Peckinpah
 Screenwriter-director, Sam Peckinpah, was the uncle of producer, David Peckinpah. (Their real names were David Edward Samuel Ernest Peckinpah Jr. and III, respectively.)

Penhaligon-Munro
 British actress, Susan Penhaligon, is the mother of fellow actor, Truan Munro.

Penn
 Actress, Eileen Ryan, and writer-director, Leo Penn, were the parents of two actors, Sean and Chris Penn, and a musician, Michael Penn. Sean was married first to Madonna and later to Robin Wright Penn
 Michael is married to musician, Aimee Mann.

Penry-Jones
 Actor, Peter Penry-Jones was married to actress Angela Thorne. They have two children, actors Laurence and Rupert.
 Laurence is married to actress Polly Walker
 Rupert is married to actress Dervla Kirwan

Perkins (Berenson-Perkins)
 Actor, Osgood Perkins (born James Ripley Osgood Robert Perkins, Sr.) was the father of actor, Anthony Perkins.
 Anthony is the father of actor, Osgood 'Oz' Perkins (born James Ripley Osgood Robert Perkins, Jr.), and musician, Elvis Perkins; their mother (Anthony's widow) is Berry Berenson. Her sister is actress, Marisa Berenson, of Barry Lyndon fame.

Perry
 The Band Perry consists of three siblings: Kimberly, Neil, and Reid Perry. They are the niece and nephews of baseball author and journalist, Dayn Perry.
 Kimberly is married to baseball player J. P. Arencibia.

Pertwee
 Playwright, screenwriter and director Roland Pertwee is the cousin of comedy actor Bill Pertwee and father of actor Jon Pertwee and screenwriter Michael Pertwee.
 Jon's first wife was actress Jean Marsh. His son from his second marriage is actor Sean Pertwee.

Phillips
 John Phillips, most famous as a member of The Mamas & the Papas, was the father of actress Mackenzie Phillips by his first wife Susan Adams; singer Chynna Phillips by his bandmate and second wife, Michelle Phillips; and actress and model Bijou Phillips by his third wife, actress Geneviève Waïte. Chynna is currently the wife of actor William Baldwin (see Baldwin).

Phoenix
 Actor siblings River, Joaquin, Rain, Liberty and Summer Phoenix. Summer Phoenix is married to actor Casey Affleck (see Affleck family).

Pine
 Actors Robert Pine and Gwynne Gilford are the parents of fellow actor Chris Pine. Anne Gwynne is the mother of Gwynne Gilford.

Pleasence
 Late actor Sir Donald Pleasence was the father of fellow actresses Miranda, Polly Jo and Angela Pleasence.

Plummer-Grimes
 Actor Christopher Plummer and actress Tammy Grimes are the parents of actress Amanda Plummer.

Poole
 Brian Poole, the frontman of Brian Poole and The Tremeloes, is the father of singer Karen and Shelly, who both had hits together as Alisha's Attic. Shelly is married to Ally McErlaine guitarist from the band Texas.

Porcaro
 Jazz drummer Joe Porcaro is the father of musician-songwriters and session players Jeff, Mike and Steve Porcaro, all members of Toto.

Potts
 La Tanya Potts is fourth generation American film pedigree. Nyanza Potts Sr., Nyanza Potts Jr.("Little Colonel"), Arvert Pott(s)("Title Big Shot"), Mahlon Potts("King Kong"), Malcolm Potts("Uncle Toms Cabin") Potts, serves as cinema historian, exhibitor, and the administrator of the Potts family motion picture legacy. Potts family legacy in cinema began in 1929. Potts has dedicated 20 years behind the scenes in casting and producing. Potts is the Executive Chair of Go2 Studios West.

Presley
 Rock 'n Roll singer Elvis Presley and wife Priscilla Presley were parents of pop singer Lisa Marie Presley; she is the former wife of pop star Michael Jackson and actor Nicolas Cage

Prinze-Gellar
 Comedian and actor Freddie Prinze was father of actor Freddie Prinze, Jr. who married actress Sarah Michelle Gellar.

Pryor
 Comic actor Richard Pryor was the father of actress Rain Pryor.

Q
Quaid
Brothers Dennis Quaid and Randy Quaid. Dennis was formerly married to actress Meg Ryan. Dennis Quaid and Meg Ryan are the parents of fellow actor Jack Quaid.

Quinn
Actor Anthony Quinn was the father of fellow actors Alex, Danny, Francesco, Lorenzo and Valentina Quinn. Danny was married to actress Lauren Holly who, in turn, was married to comedian and actor Jim Carrey.

Quintanilla-Pérez
Musician and producer A.B. Quintanilla is the older brother of slain Tejano music superstar Selena. Their sister, Suzette Quintanilla was the drummer for their band Selena y Los Dinos. Selena's widower Chris Pérez is a Grammy-winning guitarist and played guitar in Selena y Los Dinos.

R
Reddy
 Australian actor, Max Reddy, is the father of singer, Helen Reddy. Helen's nephew is musical theater performer Tony Sheldon.

Redford
 American actor/director Robert Redford is the father of actress/director Amy Redford.

Redgrave-Richardson-Nero
 Roy Redgrave was the father of Sir Michael Redgrave.
 Sir Michael was the father of siblings Vanessa, Lynn (deceased) and Corin Redgrave (deceased).
 Vanessa was married to director Tony Richardson. Their daughters are Natasha (deceased) and Joely Richardson. Vanessa and Italian actor Franco Nero's son is screenwriter and director Carlo Nero.
 Natasha was first married to producer Robert Fox; her widower is actor Liam Neeson, with whom she had two sons.
 Joely was previously married to producer Tim Bevan.
 Lynn was married to actor/director John Clark; the union ended in divorce.
 Corin's widow is actress Kika Markham and his daughter is actress Jemma Redgrave.

Refn
 Painter, Holger Refn, is the father of film editor, Anders Refn, and director, Peter Refn.
 Anders married cinematographer, Vibeke Winding (see Winding). Their son is director, Nicolas Winding Refn.
 Nicolas married actress, Liv Corfixen (see Corfixen).

Reiner
 Comedian Carl Reiner is the father of actor/director Rob Reiner who was married to Penny Marshall, sister of Garry Marshall. Carl's daughter is author and playwright Annie Reiner. Rob Reiner's and Penny Marshall's daughter is actress Tracy Reiner, who is Carl Reiner's eldest grandchild.

Richie
 R&B and soul singer, Lionel Richie, is the adoptive father of reality star, Nicole Richie and biological father of model Sofia Richie.
 Nicole is married to Good Charlotte's lead singer, Joel Madden (see Madden).
 Joel's twin brother, Benji Madden, is the lead guitarist of Good Charlotte. He is married to actress Cameron Diaz.

Ritchie
 Kid Rock (born Robert James Ritchie) is a musician. His sister, Jill Ritchie, is an actress.
 Kid Rock was once married to actress and Playboy model Pamela Anderson.

Ring
 James H. Ring, was a leading comedian of the Boston Museum company.
 Blanche Ring, his granddaughter, was an American singer and actress in Broadway theatre productions. Four generations of her ancestors were Shakespearean actors. She married an American stage and film actor, Charles Winninger.
 Her sister, Julie, is a stage actress who married actor, Al Sutherland (see Sutherland). Their son is A. Edward Sutherland, who became a film director.
 Their sister, Frances, married Thomas Meighan, the popular stage and later silent film actor.
 Their brother, Cyril Ring, was a silent film actor and husband of actress and dancer, Charlotte Greenwood.
 Jane Ring Frank, their great-niece, is a conductor.

Riperton-Rudolph-Marie
 Singer, Minnie Riperton, and musician Richard Rudolph are the parents of actress and comedian Maya Rudolph. Maya has a child with director and producer, Paul Thomas Anderson.

Ritter
 Country singer, Tex Ritter, is the father of actor, John Ritter.
 John and his first wife and actress, Nancy Morgan, are the parents of actor, Jason Ritter. John's widow is actress, Amy Yasbeck.

Robards
  Actor, Jason Robards, Sr. is the father of Jason Robards, Jr.
 Jason, Jr. was once married to actress, Lauren Bacall (see Bacall). He is the father of actors, Jason Robards III with his first wife, Eleanor Pittman, and of actor, Sam Robards with Bacall.
 Lauren was formerly the wife of actor, Humphrey Bogart.

Robert
 Actor, Yves Robert, was first married to actress, Rosy Varte, and with her has son and actor, Jean-Denis Robert. He then married actress, Danièle Delorme (born Gabrielle Danièle Marguerite Andrée Girard) (see Girard.
 Rosy later married actor and director, Pierre Badel.

Roberts
 Siblings Julia Roberts, Lisa Roberts Gillan and Eric Roberts are all actors.
 Eric is the father of actress Emma Roberts.

Robinson
 Actor Matt Robinson was the father of fellow actress Holly Robinson. Holly is married to former football player turned broadcaster, Rodney Peete.

Robinson-Clark
 We the Kings lead singer and YouTube personality Travis Robinson-Clark is married to actress and model Jenny Robinson-Clark. Travis's brother, musician Taylor Clark, is the former We the Kings drummer.

Rocco
 Actor, Alex Rocco, is the adoptive father of motion picture director, Marc Rocco.

Rodgers-Guettel
 Composer Richard Rodgers is the father of author Mary Rodgers, who is the mother of composer Adam Guettel.

Ronson-Jones
 Mick Jones of Foreigner is the stepfather of producer and DJ Mark Ronson, fashion designer Charlotte Ronson, and DJ/singer Samantha Ronson.

Ross-Gordy-Naess
 Motown diva Diana Ross of The Supremes is the mother of singer Rhonda Ross Kendrick (whose father is Berry Gordy), actress Tracee Ellis Ross, model Chudney Ross, and actor Evan Ross, and was one-time stepmother of pop singer Leona Naess.

Rossellini-Lindström-Bergman
 Actress Isabella Rossellini is the child of film director Roberto Rossellini and actress Ingrid Bergman. News anchorwoman Pia Lindström, the daughter of Ingrid from her first marriage, is the half-sister of Isabella,

Rosson
 Actress Helene Rosson was a noted silent screen actress. Her brothers were cinematographer Harold Rosson (aka Hal Rosson) and directors Arthur Rosson and Richard Rosson.

S
Sagal
 Director Boris Sagal was the father of actors Jean, Joe, Katey and Liz Sagal. Boris's second wife was the dancer and actress Marge Champion, who was previously married to choreographer, actor, and dancer Gower Champion.

Salkind
 Producer Alexander Salkind was the father of fellow producer Ilya Salkind. Ilya was previously married to actress Skye Aubrey, the daughter of actress Phyllis Thaxter.

Samuel
 Musician Seal (born Olusegun Adeola Akarbi Samuel) is the brother of Jeymes Samuel, better known as The Bullitts, a singer-songwriter. He married supermodel Heidi Klum.
 Heidi has a biological child with Italian Formula One team manager Flavio Briatore.

Santiago-Casanova
 Guitarron player Natividad Santiago was the father of fellow guitarron player Enrique Santiago. Both have been members of the Vargas de Tecalitlan. Santiago's daughter is comedian/singer Cessy Casanova.

Sarafian
Film director, Deran Sarafian, and scriptwriter, Tedi Sarafian, are the sons of Richard C. Sarafian, another film director. They are nephews of director and screenwriter, Robert Altman.

Sariñana
 Film director Fernando Sariñana is the father of actress/singer Ximena Sariñana.

Savage
 Siblings Fred, Ben and Kala Savage are all actors.

Savage-Youngs
 Actor John Savage (born John Youngs) is the brother of fellow actors Jim and Gail Youngs. John's daughter is actress Jennifer Youngs.

Savalas-Adams-Sheridan
Brothers Telly and George Savalas were actors. Telly was married to actress Sally Adams (whose stage names were Dani Sheridan and Sally Sheridan). 
Telly's daughter, Candace Savalas, and his stepdaughter, Nicolette Sheridan, are actresses.

Sawalha
 Actor Nadim Sawalha is the father of actresses/sisters Julia and Nadia Sawalha.

Schneider-King
 Actor and comedian Rob Schneider, is the brother of producer John Schneider.
 Rob was once married to and has a daughter with former model London King, musician Elle King (born Tanner Elle Schneider). He later married television producer Patricia Azarcoya Arce.

Schöbel-Doerk-Lacasa
 Singer and actor Frank Schöbel was 
 first married to singer and actress Chris Doerk
 in a longtime relationship with singer and artist Aurora Lacasa; daughter of both is singer and actress Dominique Lacasa

Scott
 Directors/producers Ridley and Tony were brothers.

Scott-Dewhurst
 Twice-married and divorced actors George C. Scott and Colleen Dewhurst had two sons, Alexander Scott and actor Campbell Scott.

Seals-Duncan
 Musicians Jim Seals, of Seals and Crofts, and Dan Seals, of England Dan & John Ford Coley and his own solo career, are brothers. They are cousins to country singer, guitarist, and songwriter Troy Seals, who in turn is the uncle of country singer Brady Seals. Another country artist, Johnny Duncan, was a cousin to Jim and Dan.

Sellers
 Actors Britt Ekland and Peter Sellers are the parents of actress Victoria Sellers.

Selznick
 Lewis J. Selznick, is the father of film producer and screenwriter, David O. Selznick, and film producer, Myron Selznick. 
 David married theatrical producer, Irene Mayer (see Mayer), daughter of Louis B. Mayer, a film producer. They had two sons, Lewis Jeffrey and Daniel Selznick, both of whom also became film producers. He later married the actress Jennifer Jones.
 Jennifer was previously married to actor, Robert Walker (see Walker). They have sons and actors, Robert Walker, Jr. and Michael Walker. After Selznick, Jones married industrialist, Norton Simon. 
 Daniel married Susan Warms Dryfoos, daughter of Orvil E. Dryfoos, publisher of the New York Times.
 Myron married silent film actress, Marjorie Daw.
 Marjorie was previously married to director and actor, A. Edward Sutherland (see Sutherland).

Severn
 Siblings Clifford Severn, Raymond Severn, Christopher Severn, Yvonne Severn, Venetia Severn, William Severn, Ernest Severn and Winston Severn.

Seymour
 Rosemary Nest Scott-Ellis (see Ellis) and George Fitzroy Seymour (cadet branch of Marquess of Hertford and Duke of Somerset of Thrumpton Hall) are the parents of literary critic and author, Miranda Seymour.
 Miranda married the novelist and historian, Andrew Sinclair (see Sinclair), and had a son, Merlin. Her second marriage was to Anthony Gottlieb, then executive editor of The Economist and author of a history of Western philosophy.

Shakur
 Rapper, Tupac Shakur, has several family members who were members of the Black Panthers: Mutulu Shakur, his step-father, Assata Shakur, his step-aunt, Billy Garland, his biological father, and Afeni Shakur, his mother.
 His stepbrother, Mopreme Shakur, is a rapper.

Shankar-Jones
 Renowned sitar player Ravi Shankar is the younger brother of Indian classical dancer Uday Shankar.
 Uday was the father of Bengali musician Ananda Shankar and actress and dancer Mamata Shankar. Ananda's widow is Indian dancer and choreographer Tanusree Shankar.
 Ravi was married to Indian classical musician Annapurna Devi, daughter of renowned instrumentalist and teacher Allauddin Khan. He is the father of musician and composer Shubhendra Shankar, American jazz-pop singer Norah Jones and British sitar player Anoushka Shankar.

Shatner-Gretsch
 Actor William Shatner is the father of actress Melanie Shatner, who is married to actor Joel Gretsch.

Shaughnessy
 Screenwriter Alfred Shaughnessy is the father of actors Charles Shaughnessy and David Shaughnessy.

Shaw
 Actor-novelist Robert Shaw was the father of actor Ian Shaw.

Shaw brothers
 Movie studio executives Run Run and his third brother Runme Shaw were owners of Shaw Brothers Studio and Shaw Organisation. The other brothers, Runje, Runde, were involved in the movie industry.

Shu
 Actress and singer Barbie Shu is the sister of Dee Shu in which they had a notable pop career together.

Shue
 Andrew and Elisabeth Shue are actors. She is married to director Davis Guggenheim (An Inconvenient Truth), whose father Charles Guggenheim was also a documentary filmmaker. Andrew is married to news journalist Amy Robach.

Sheen
 see Estévez

Shrapnel
 English actor, John Shrapnel, is the father of actors, Lex Shrapnel and Tom Shrapnel, and writer, Joe Shrapnel.

Siemaszko
 Actor, Casey Siemaszko, is the older sister to actress, Nina Siemaszko.

Simon
 Jazz writer and musician, George T. Simon, is the uncle of singer-songwriter, Carly Simon.
 Carly's first husband, singer-songwriter, James Taylor (see Taylor).
 James and Carly are the parents of musicians Ben and Sally Taylor.

Simon-Brickell
 Singer-songwriter Paul Simon is the father of fellow singer-songwriter Harper Simon by his first marriage to photographer Peggy Harper.
 His second marriage was to actress and author Carrie Fisher, the daughter of singer Eddie Fisher and actress Debbie Reynolds.
 His third and current marriage is to former New Bohemians lead singer-songwriter Edie Brickell. They have three children: Adrian, Lulu and Gabriel. Edie and her stepson Harper have a band called The Heavy Circles.

Simpson
 Actress, fashion designer, and singer, Jessica Simpson, was married to singer, producer, and actor, Nick Lachey. Jessica's sister is actress and singer, Ashlee Simpson.
 Lachey is now married to actress, Vanessa Minnillo.
 Ashlee was married to Fall Out Boy bassist, Pete Wentz.

Sinatra
 Actor Frank Sinatra was the father of actor/singer Frank Sinatra, Jr. and actress/singer Nancy Sinatra.
 Sinatra was also married to actresses Ava Gardner and Mia Farrow.

Sinden
 Actor, Sir Donald Sinden, whose younger brother is the actor Leon Sinden (whose partner was the actor Walter Carr), was married to the late actress Diana Mahony. They had two children: actor Jeremy Sinden (who was married to the actress Delia Lindsay) and actor and film director Marc Sinden who was married to the film producer Jo Gilbert. The Edwardian actress Topsy Sinden (1878–1950) and her brother actor Bert Sinden (1879–1911), were cousins.

Singer
 Musician, Jacques Singer, is the father of actors, Marc and Lori Singer.
 Jacques is the uncle and Marc and Lori are the cousins of motion picture-director, Bryan Singer.

Skarsgård
 Swedish actor, Stellan Skarsgård, is the father of the actors, Alexander, Gustaf, and Bill Skarsgård

Slezak
 Opera singer, Leo Slezak, is the father of actor, Walter Slezak.
 Walter's daughter is actress, Erika Slezak.

Smallbone-Fink
 Contemporary Christian singer, Rebecca Smallbone, better known by her stage name, Rebecca St. James, is the older sister of fellow contemporary Christian artists, Joel and Luke Smallbone, who perform as the band, For King & Country. In addition, she is the wife of Jacob Fink, bass guitarist of Foster the People.

Smith
 Rapper and actor, Will Smith is the father of actor Trey Smith by his first wife, actress Sheree Zampino, and actors Jaden and Willow Smith by his second and current wife, actress Jada Pinkett Smith.

Smollett
 Actor and photographer Jussie Smollett is the older brother of actors Jurnee Smollett and Jake Smollett.

Sorvino
 Actor Paul Sorvino is the father of actress Mira Sorvino.

Spacek-Fisk
 Actress Sissy Spacek is the mother of actress Schuyler Fisk.

Spall
 Actor Timothy Spall is the father of actor Rafe Spall.
 Rafe is married to actress Elize du Toit.

Spelling
 Producer, Aaron Spelling, was married to actress, Carolyn Jones. He then married author and television personality, Candy Spelling. He and Candy are the parents of actress, Tori Spelling, and actor, Randy Spelling.
 Carolyn later married producer, Herbert Greene.
 Tori was once married to actor and playwright, Charlie Shanian. She is now married to actor, Dean McDermott.
 McDermott was once married to actress and singer, Mary Jo Eustace.

Spielberg-Capshaw
 Director, Steven Spielberg, married first to actress, Amy Irving, is now husband of actress and producer, Kate Capshaw. Spielberg and Capshaw are the parents of actress-musician, Sasha Spielberg.
 Kate's daughter from her previous marriage is actress, Jessica Capshaw.

Sprouse
 Dylan and Cole Sprouse are actors and twin brothers who came to fame as children in a popular Disney Channel sitcom, The Suite Life of Zack and Cody.

Stallone
 Actor, writer, and hairstylist Frank Stallone, Sr. is the father of actors Sylvester Stallone and Frank Stallone with first wife and astrologer Jackie Stallone.
 Sylvester is the father of actor Sage Stallone with wife Sasha Czack. He later married model and actress Brigitte Nielsen. He then married model Jennifer Flavin.
 Sage married actress Starlin Wright.

Standing
 Actor, Herbert Standing, is the father of economist, Guy Standing, actors, Wyndham Standing, Percy Standing, Jack Standing, and Herbert Standing, Jr.
 Herbert, Jr.'s daughter is actress, Joan Standing.

Starkey/Starr
 Musician, Ringo Starr of The Beatles is married to Barbara Bach and is the father of musician, Zak Starkey.

Stauffer
 Actor, Jack Stauffer, was married to actress, Renne Jarrett, with whom he has son and actor, Drew Stauffer.
 Renne later married film director, Bruce Bilson (see Bilson).

Stefani
 Animator and musician Eric Stefani, is older brother of singer, Gwen Stefani, who was married to fellow singer, Gavin Rossdale.

Stephens
 Actor Sir Robert Stephens is the father of actors Chris Larkin and Toby Stephens through his third wife Dame Maggie Smith. He later married actress Patricia Quinn, whose nephew is rock musician Jonny Quinn. Smith later remarried playwright and screenwriter Beverley Cross.
 Toby is married to actress Anna-Louise Plowman

Sterling/Sothern/Jeffries
 Actor Robert Sterling and his first wife actress Ann Sothern were the parents of actress Tisha Sterling. Sterling's second marriage was to his TV series Topper co-star Anne Jeffreys.

Stewart
 Singer, Rod Stewart, has been married several times with many different children. He was first married to actress, Alana Stewart (nee Collins). Together they have daughter and model, Kimberly Stewart, and son and reality star, Sean Stewart.
 Kimberly has a daughter with actor, Benicio del Toro (see del Toro).
 Alana was also previously married actor, George Hamilton. They have one child, actor Ashley Hamilton.
 Rod then began a relationship with model, Kelly Emberg. They have a daughter, model and singer Ruby Stewart.
 Rod's second marriage was to model Rachel Hunter. They have two children together.
 Rod's third marriage was to model Penny Lancaster. They have two children together.

Stiller
 Anne Meara and husband Jerry Stiller are parents to son Ben Stiller and daughter Amy Stiller. Ben is married to actress Christine Taylor.

Stills
 American rock musician Stephen Stills and his former wife, French singer-songwriter Véronique Sanson, are the parents of musician Chris Stills.

Stockwell
 Actors Nina Olivette and Harry Stockwell were the parents of actors Dean and Guy Stockwell.

Stoppard
 Playwright, screenwriter and critic Sir Tom Stoppard is the father of actor Ed Stoppard.

Streisand-Gould-Brolin
 Actress Barbra Streisand was married to actor Elliott Gould, with whom she had one child: actor Jason Gould. She is now married to actor James Brolin.
 James Brolin is the father of actor Josh Brolin by his first marriage. His second marriage was to actress Jan Smithers.
Josh Brolin was married to actress Diane Lane.
Barbra's half sister is actress and singer Roslyn Kind.

Streep-Gummer
 Actress Meryl Streep is married to sculptor Don Gummer, and their children include musician Henry Gummer and actresses Mamie and Grace Gummer. Streep is also the sister-in-law of actress Maeve Kinkead.

Sturges-Close-Merrill-Robertson
 Director Preston Sturges married Eleanor Post Close, the daughter of Edward Bennett Close and Marjorie Meriwether Post. Edward Bennett Close, by his second wife, became the grandfather of actress Glenn Close. Marjorie Post, by her second husband, was the mother of actress Dina Merrill, whose second husband was late Oscar-winning actor Cliff Robertson.

Sumner
 Rock musician Sting (real name Gordon Sumner) has been married to actress Frances Tomelty and actress and producer Trudie Styler. Among his children with Tomelty is musician and entrepreneur Joe Sumner. Among his children with Styler are actress Mickey Sumner and musician Eliot Sumner.

Sutherland
 Donald Sutherland is the father of actors Kiefer (by second wife, Canadian actress Shirley Douglas), Rossif and Angus (both by third wife actress Francine Racette).

Sutherland
 Director and actor, A. Edward Sutherland, is the nephew of both actors Blanche Ring (see Ring) and Thomas Meighan. He was first married to actress Marjorie Daw. Later he married actress Louise Brooks.
 Marjorie was previously married to actor Myron Selznick (see Selznick).

Swift
 Clive Swift is the brother of actor David Swift. Clive is the father of TV gardener Joe Swift, and his mother is Margaret Drabble. Margaret is the sister of writer A. S. Byatt. David is the father of Julia Swift

T
Talmadge
 Norma and Constance Talmadge are 1920s movie stars. Their sister is actress, Natalie Talmadge, who was the first wife of actor, Buster Keaton (see Keaton).
They are not related to Hollywood stuntman, Richard Talmadge.

Tamblyn
 Actors Eddie Tamblyn and Sally Aileen Tamblyn were married, and their sons were actor Russ Tamblyn and singer/musician Larry Tamblyn of The Standells.
 One of Russ's children is actress Amber Tamblyn.

Tarbuck
 English comedian Jimmy Tarbuck is the father of actress Liza Tarbuck.

Taurog-Cooper
Director Norman Taurog was the uncle of actor and director Jackie Cooper.

Taylor
 Singer-songwriter James Taylor (see Taylor) has four musical siblings with recorded albums — Alex, Livingston, Kate and Hugh Taylor. James was once married to singer-songwriter Carly Simon (see Simon).
 James and Carly are the parents of musicians Ben and Sally Taylor.

Thicke
 Actor and singer-songwriter Alan Thicke is the brother of composer Todd Thicke.
 Alan's sons are actor Brennan Thicke and singer Robin Thicke. Alan used to be married to singer Gloria Loring.
 Robin married actress Paula Patton.

Thomas-Donahue
 Comic actor, Danny Thomas, is the father of actress, Marlo Thomas, film producer, Tony Thomas, and former actress, Terre Thomas.
 Marlo has been the wife of talk-show host, Phil Donahue, since 1980.

Thompson-Tilbury
 English dancer, actress, and producer, Lydia Thompson, was the mother of stage and screen actress, Zeffie Tilbury.

Thompson
 Actor Eric Thompson is married to actress Phyllida Law, and they have two daughters, actresses Emma and Sophie Thompson.
 Sophie is married to actor Richard Lumsden.
 Emma was married to Kenneth Branagh and later to Greg Wise.

Tisdale
 Actresses Ashley and Jennifer Tisdale are sisters.

Tom
 Soap opera actress Heather Tom is the elder sister of twins David (her frequent co-star) and Nicholle Tom.

Travolta
 Siblings Ellen, Joey, Ann, Margaret, Sam and John Travolta
 Ellen is married to actor Jack Bannon
 John is married to actress and model Kelly Preston

Trippy
 YouTube personality and We the Kings band bassist Charles Trippy is son of musician and former Gregg Allman Band (see Allman) percussionist Chaz Trippy. Charles was formerly married to YouTube personality and travel vlogger, Alli Speed. His sister, Melissa Trippy, is also a YouTube personality.

Troughton
 Actor Patrick Troughton was the father mof actors David and Michael Troughton
 David is the father of actor Sam Troughton and cricketer Jim Troughton
 Actor Harry Melling is the son of Patrick's older daughter Joanna

Troup
 Actors Bobby Troup and Julie London were the parents of fellow actresses Cynnie, Ronne and Kelly Troup.

Tsang
 Television presenter, comedian-actor and director Eric Tsang is the father of actor Derek Tsang and singer-actress Bowie Tsang.

Tse
 Producer and actor Patrick Tse and former wife actress Deborah Lee were the parents of actor and singer Nicholas Tse, who was married to actress and Cantopop singer Cecilia Cheung.

Tyler
 Playboy model Bebe Buell and her partner, rock musician Todd Rundgren, raised Liv Tyler. Liv later found out that Steven Tyler of Aerosmith was her biological father. He is the father of model Mia Tyler. Liv was married to musician Royston Langdon. They are unrelated to the Bonnie Tyler family.

V
 Vale
Actor/comedian/singer Raul Vale was married to actress/singer Angelica Maria from 1974 until 1989.
Their daughter, Angelica Vale, is an actress, comedian and singer.

Van Dyke-Nance
 Actors Dick and Jerry Van Dyke are brothers.
 Dick's son Barry Van Dyke is an actor and writer as well as a producer. Barry's son Shane is a screenwriter, actor and director.
 Jerry's daughter Kelly Jean Van Dyke was an adult film actress who was married to actor Jack Nance when she committed suicide.
 Dick's grandson Carey Van Dyke is an actor.

Van Patten-Balsam-Dugan
 Actors Dick and Joyce Van Patten are siblings. Director Tim Van Patten is their half-brother.
 Dick is the father of actors Vince, Nels, and James Van Patten.
 Joyce and her first husband, actor Martin Balsam, are the parents of actress Talia Balsam. Joyce's second husband was actor-director Dennis Dugan.

Van Peebles
 Motion picture-writer/director Melvin Van Peebles is the father of fellow director (and actor) Mario Van Peebles.

Vernon
 Actor John Vernon was the father of actress Kate Vernon.

Vertue
 Media executive and producer Beryl Vertue is the mother of producer Sue Vertue, who is married to screenwriter Steven Moffat.

Vidal
 Actresses Lisa, Christina and Tanya Vidal are sisters.

Voight-Jolie-Haven-Taylor
 Actor Jon Voight is the father of actress Angelina Jolie and director James Haven, by his former wife, the late Marcheline Bertrand. Jon Voight's brother is songwriter Chip Taylor.

Von Erich
 Professional wrestler and wrestling promoter Jack Adkisson, better known as Fritz Von Erich, was the father of five sons who followed in his footsteps as wrestlers under the Von Erich name—Kevin, David, Kerry, Mike, and Chris. The family is famous for its supposed "curse"—although Jack lived until his natural death, his oldest son, Jack Jr., was killed in a freak childhood accident, David died in 1984 under disputed circumstances, and Mike, Chris, and Kerry all committed suicide between 1987 and 1993.
 Kevin's son Ross and Kerry's daughter Lacey are wrestlers who perform under the Von Erich name.

W
Wagner
 Actor Jack Wagner was married to actress Kristina Wagner.

Wahlberg
 Donnie Wahlberg is best known as a member of pop group New Kids on the Block and as an actor. Rapper-turned-actor Mark Wahlberg (not to be confused with actor and talk-show host Mark L. Walberg) is his brother. Robert Wahlberg, actor, and Paul Wahlberg, actor, are also their brothers. They are the sons of actress, Alma McPeck Wahlberg Conroy.
 Donnie is married to actress and model, Jenny McCarthy (see McCarthy).
 Mark is married to actress and model, Rhea Durham.

Wainwright-McGarrigle-Roche
 Loudon Wainwright III (son of Time magazine columnist and Life magazine editor Loudon Wainwright, Jr.), his sister Sloan Wainwright, son Rufus Wainwright and daughter Martha Wainwright are all singer-songwriters. Rufus and Martha are the children of Loudon's former wife Kate McGarrigle, of the singing sisters Kate and Anna McGarrigle; their sister Jane McGarrigle is a composer, while Anna's daughter Lily Lanken (by her husband, journalist Dane Lanken, who has sung with the McGarrigles) is a singer. Loudon's second daughter Lucy Wainwright Roche, whose mother is Suzzy Roche of singing sisters The Roches, is another singer-songwriter.

Walker
 Charlotte Walker was a well- respected Broadway actress. She was the mother of character actress Sara Haden

Walker-Jones
 Actor Robert Walker and his wife Jennifer Jones were the parents of actors Robert Walker Jr. and Michael Walker.

Wanamaker
 Actor/director Sam Wanamaker was the father of actress Zoë Wanamaker.

Warner-Hauser-Sperling
 Brothers Harry, Albert, Sam and Jack Warner founded and directed Warner Brothers studio
 Actor Cole Hauser is the son of Wings Hauser, another actor; who is the son of screenwriter Dwight Hauser. Cole's maternal great-grandfather was film mogul Harry Warner, and his maternal grandfather was Milton Sperling, a Hollywood screenwriter and independent film producer.

Warren-Alba
 Actor Michael Warren is the father of actor and producer Cash Warren, whose wife is actress Jessica Alba.

Waterman
 Actor and singer Dennis Waterman is the father of actress Hannah Waterman by his second wife actress Patricia Maynard. His third wife was actress Rula Lenska.

Waterston
 Actor Sam Waterston is the father of actor James Waterston and actress Katherine Waterston.

Watson
 Siblings Bobs Watson, Delmar Watson, Harry Watson, Coy Watson Jr., Vivian Watson, Gloria Watson, Louise Watson, Billy Watson and Garry Watson.

Watling
 Actor Jack Watling and actress Patricia Hicks are the parents of actresses Dilys Watling and Deborah Watling and actor Giles Watling.

Way
 Brothers Gerard and Mikey Way are singers (My Chemical Romance).

Wayans
 Siblings Damon Wayans, Dwayne Wayans, Elvira Wayans, Keenen Ivory Wayans, Kim Wayans, Marlon Wayans, Nadia Wayans, Shawn Wayans, and Chaunté Wayans.

Wayne
 Actor John Wayne was the father of actors Patrick Wayne and Ethan Wayne.

Weinstein
 Founders of Miramax and The Weinstein Company, Producers Harvey Weinstein and brother Bob Weinstein.

Weisser
 Actor Norbert Weisser is the father of fellow actor Morgan Weisser.

Weissmuller
 Actor Johnny Weissmuller is the father of Johnny Weissmuller, Jr.

Westcott
Actor Gordon Westcott was the father of actress Helen Westcott.

West-Scales
 Actor Lockwood West is the father of actor Timothy West
 Timothy married actress Prunella Scales and their son is actor and director Samuel West

Whitmore
 Actor James Whitmore is the father of fellow actor James Whitmore, Jr.

Wilcox
 Documentary maker and producer Desmond Wilcox was married to journalist turned presenter Esther Rantzen. Their daughter Rebecca is a producer and television presenter.

Wilde
 Singer-songwriter Marty Wilde and singer/actress Joyce Baker are the parents of composer-performer-producer Ricky Wilde and singer-actress Kim Wilde.

Williams (Hank)
 Hank Williams was a leading figure in country music history.
 Hank's son Randall Hank, better known as Hank Williams, Jr., has had an enormously successful country career of his own.
 Hank Jr.'s children Hank Williams III (real first name Shelton) and Holly Williams are both successful country musicians.
 Jett Williams, the posthumously born daughter of Hank and half-sister to Hank Jr., had modest success in country music.

Williams (John)
 Composer/conductor John Williams and actress/singer Barbara Ruick are the parents of Toto's lead singer Joseph Williams and drummer Mark T. Williams. John is the brother of percussionist Don Williams, who has performed on many of John's film scores, and the son of Jazz drummer Johnny Williams. Barbara Ruick is the daughter of late actors Melville Ruick and Lurene Tuttle.

Wilson/Love
 Murry Wilson, a musician and record producer, was the father of Brian, Dennis, and Carl Wilson. The three sons, plus their first cousin Mike Love, were members of The Beach Boys.
 Brian and his first wife, singer Marilyn Rovell, are the parents of Carnie and Wendy Wilson, singers who formed two-thirds of the vocal group Wilson Phillips.

Wilson (2000s (decade) actors)
 Actors Andrew Wilson, Owen Wilson, and Luke Wilson are brothers, and unrelated to The Beach Boys family.

Winans
 David and Dolores Winans, gospel music singers, recorded both together and separately as "Pop" and "Mom" Winans, and became progenitors of a highly prolific musical family. The following musicians can trace their family roots to Pop and Mom Winans:
 The second through fifth sons of Pop and Mom—Ronald, Marvin, Carvin, and Michael Winans—are best known as the gospel group The Winans. Marvin's former wife, Vickie Winans, has had a successful music career, and Michael has recorded with his wife Regina.
 Four sons of The Winans—Marvin Jr., Carvin Jr., Michael Jr., and another son of Carvin Sr., Juan Winans—have recorded together as Winans Phase 2.
 Mario Winans is Vickie's son from her prior marriage to Ronald Brown.
 Daniel Winans, a gospel singer and producer, is Mom and Pop's sixth son.
 The seventh Winans son, Benjamin "BeBe" Winans, and the eighth child and oldest daughter, Priscilla "CeCe" Winans, have performed both as BeBe & CeCe Winans and as solo artists.
 The two youngest of Pop and Mom's children, Angie and Debbie Winans, have recorded both together and as soloists.

Winding (Vinding)
 Author and journalist, Andreas Vinding, with his wife and actress, Agis Winding, he has son and journalist, Ole Vinding.
 Actor, producer, and author, Thomas Winding, is the son of Ole.
 Thomas was married five times. With his former wife and cinematographer, Vibeke Winding, he is the father of singer, Kasper Winding, and actress, Sara Winding. With Lulu Gauguin (see Gauguin) he has daughter and singer, Alberte.
 Vibeke later married film editor and director, Anders Refn (see Refn). They are the parents of director and screenwriter, Nicolas Winding Refn.
 Nicolas is married to actress, Liv Corfixen (see Corfixen).
 Kasper was first married to actress, Brigitte Nielsen. Their son is television personality, Julian Winding. He was later married to actress, Simone Bendix. With writer and photographer, Pia Tryde, he has son and screenwriter, Oliver Winding.
 Nielsen was married to actor Sylvester Stallone (see Stallone), director and photographer Sebastian Copeland (see Casadesus), television writer Raoul Meyer and producer Mattia Dessi.
 Alberte was married to singer and composer January Rørdam. She is now married to guitarist Andreas Fuglebæk.

Wong
 Brothers Michael and Russell Wong are both actors.

Woodward
 Edward Woodward was the father of actors Tim and Peter Woodward.
 NOTE: The family is unrelated to American actress Joanne Woodward

Wynn-Williams
 Actor Ed Wynn was the father of actor Keenan Wynn, whose sons are screenwriters Ned and Tracy Wynn. Keenan's daughter Hilda was married to actor-musician Paul Williams.

Y
York-Wells
 Susannah York and her son, Orlando Wells.

Young
 Actor Gig Young, born Byron Elsworth Barr, was married to Sophie Rosenstein, the resident drama coach at Paramount, actress Elizabeth Montgomery (see Montgomery), and German magazine editor Kim Schmidt.

Yuen
 Renowned martial arts choreographer Yuen Woo-ping is the son of Yuen Siu-tien, a martial arts film actor.

Z
Zane
 Lisa and Billy Zane

Zanuck

 Film producer and former 20th Century Fox VP of production Darryl F. Zanuck, his son, film producer and former head of production at Fox, Richard D. Zanuck. Richard's son Dean Zanuck is also a film producer.

Zappa-Sloatman-Robinson
 Composer-musician-producer Frank Zappa was the father of: actress-author-singer Moon Unit who is married to Paul Doucette, former drummer and current rhythm guitarist of Matchbox Twenty; actor-composer-musician Dweezil; actor-author-musician Ahmet Zappa; actress-photographer Diva Zappa. Frank's niece is actress (and, more recently, costumer) Lala Sloatman, who was married to Black Crowes lead singer/co-founder Chris Robinson.

Zimbalist
 Composer and violinist Efrem Zimbalist and his wife, soprano Alma Gluck, were the parents of actor Efrem Zimbalist, Jr.
 Efrem Jr. is in turn the father of actress Stephanie Zimbalist.

Zucker
 David and Jerry Zucker

Celebrity brothers not listed above
Jason (1987–) and Michael Castro (1988–)
Dana Andrews (1909–1992) and Steve Forrest (1924–2013) (born William Forrest Andrews)
James Arness (1923–2011) and Peter Graves (1926–2010) (born James and Peter Aurness)
Aaron Ashmore and Shawn Ashmore (twins, 1979–)
John (1949–1982) and James Belushi (1954–)
Timothy (1951–), Joseph (1954–), Sam (1955–2008), and Ben Bottoms (1960–)
Scott (1973–) and Brian Bloom (1970–)
Flesh (1973-) and Layzie Bone (1975-) founding members of Bone Thugs n Harmony
Keith (1949–) and Robert Carradine (1954–) and half-brother Michael Bowen (1957–) (all sons of Sonia Sorel; Keith and Robert from her marriage to John Carradine, and Michael Bowen from her marriage to artist Michael Bowen)
Gerald (1948–) and Bob Casale (1952–2014), founding members of Devo
Cameron (1965–), Andrew (1967–), Lochie Daddo (1970–)
Melvin (1954-2019), Kenneth (1959–), and Kevon Edmonds (1958–); born Kevin Edmonds) — Melvin and Kevon are members of the R&B group After 7, while Kenneth is better-known as R&B singer and producer Babyface.
Nesuhi (1917–1989) and Ahmet Ertegun (1923–2006)
Chris (1981–) and Scott Evans (1983–)
Max (1983–) and Thom Evans (1985–)
George Ezra (1993–) and Ten Tonnes (1996–)
Fred (fl. 2009) and Richard Fairbrass (1953–), members of Right Said Fred
Tim (1957–), Andrew (1959–), and Jon Farriss (1961–), members of INXS
Peter (1956–) and Bobby Farrelly (1958–)
Justin (1961–1998) and John Fashanu (1962–)
Tim (1952–) and Neil Finn (1958–), of Split Enz and later Crowded House
Daniel (1961–) and Jerome Flynn (1963–)
Parry (1992–) and Lloyd Glasspool (1993–)
James (1929–1998) and William Goldman (1931–2018) (writers)
Matt and Luke Goss (twins, 1968–), members of the boy band Bros
Cedric "K-Ci" (1969–) and Joel "Jo-Jo" Hailey (1971–) — K-Ci & JoJo, and of Jodeci
Murray (1946–) and Anthony Head (1954–)
Michael (1942–), Ricky (1946–2011) and Samuel Hui (1948–)
James (1952-2019), and Phillip Ingram (1958-)  
Craig (1970–) and Dean Lennox Kelly (1975–)
Andrei Konchalovsky (1937–; born Andrei Mikhalkov) and Nikita Mikhalkov (1945–)
John Leslie (born Leslie John Stott; 1965–) and Grant Stott
Jason and Jeremy London (twins, 1972–)
Los Lonely Boys – Henry (1978–), Jojo (1980–), and Ringo Garza (1981–)
The Marx Brothers (comedians); Chico/Leonard (1887–1961), Harpo/Arthur (1888–1964), Groucho/Julius (1890–1977), Gummo/Milton (1892–1977) and Zeppo/Herbet (1901–1979). (They also had an older brother, who died as an infant.)
James McCourt (1974–) and Richard McCourt (1976–)
The Melendez brothers; Ricky, Carlos and Oscar Melendez
The Mills Brothers – John Jr. (1910–1936), Herbert (1912–1989), Harry (1913–1982), and Donald (1915–1999).
Lars Mikkelsen (1964–) and Mads Mikkelsen (1965–)
Eddie Montgomery (1963–) of Montgomery Gentry and John Michael Montgomery (1965–)
Mark (1950–) and Bob (1952–) and Jim Mothersbaugh (1954–), also founding members of Devo
The Neville Brothers – Art (1937–2019), Aaron (1941–), Charles (1938–2018), and Cyril Neville (1948–) 
Christopher (1970–) and Jonathan Nolan (1976–)
Jerry (1974–) and Charlie O'Connell (1975–)
Logan (1995–) and Jake Paul (1997–)
Mark and Michael Polish
AJ (1994–) and Curtis Pritchard (1996–)
The Proclaimers: Identical twins Charlie and Craig Reid (1962–)
Charlie (1991–) and Stephen Puth (1994–)
The Ritz Brothers; Al (1901–1965), Jimmy (1904–1985) and Harry (1907–1986)
Paul (1956–) and Jonathan Ross (1960–)
Anthony and Peter Shaffer (twins, 1926–2001 and 1926–2016)
The Sherman Brothers — Robert (1925–2012) and Richard (1928–)
George (1975–) and Geoff Stults (1977–)
John (1944–) and David Suchet (1946–)
Patrick (1952–2009) and Don Swayze (1958–)
DeVante Swing (1969–; born Donald DeGrate, Jr.) and Dalvin DeGrate (1971–), members of Jodeci with another set of brothers, K-Ci & JoJo
Alex (1953–) and Eddie Van Halen (1955–2020), founding members of the rock band Van Halen
Ronnie (1948–1977), Donnie (1952–), and Johnny Van Zant (1960–) — Ronnie was a founder and lead vocalist of Lynyrd Skynyrd, Donnie was founder and lead vocalist of 38 Special, and Johnny is the lead vocalist of today's Lynyrd Skynyrd. Donnie and Johnny also perform together as Van Zant.
Jeremy (1965–) and Tim Vine (1967–) 
Johnny (1944–2014) and Edgar Winter (1946–)
George (1947–2017), Malcolm (1953–2017), Angus Young (1955–), members of the rock band AC/DC
Shannon (1970–) and Jared Leto (1971–)
Josh (1987–) and Zac Farro (1990–) from rock band Paramore.

Celebrity sisters
The Andrews Sisters: Laverne (1911–1967), Maxene (1916–1995), and Patty Andrews (1918–2013)
Haylie (1985–) and Hilary Duff (1987–)
Gayle and Gillian Blakeney (twins, 1966–)
Moya Brennan (1952–) and Enya (1961–) (born Máire Philomena Ní Bhraonáin and Eithne Pádraigín Ní Bhraonáin, respectively)
Brittany and Cynthia Daniel (twins, 1976–)
Marieh (1977–) and Majandra Delfino (1981–)
Emily (1976–) and Zooey Deschanel (1980–)
Nora (1941–2012) and Delia Ephron (1944–)
Dakota (1994–) and Elle Fanning (1998–)
Magda (1915–1997), Zsa Zsa (1917–2016), and Eva Gabor (1919–1995)
La'Myia (1979–) and Meagan Good (1981–)
Lynx and Lamb Gaede (twins, born 1992; members of the white nationalist folk duo Prussian Blue)
Melissa Joan (1976–) and Emily Hart (1986–)
Olivia de Havilland (1916–2020) and Joan Fontaine (born Joan de Beauvoir de Havilland) (1917–2013)
Norah Jones (born 1979) and half-sister Anoushka Shankar (born 1981) are the daughters of Ravi Shankar
Beyoncé (1981–) and Solange Knowles (1986–)
Shelby Lynne (1968–) and Allison Moorer (1972–)
Martie Maguire (1969–) and Emily Strayer (1972–), both members of Dixie Chicks
Kate Mara and Rooney Mara
Christine, Dorothy and Phyllis McGuire
Alyson (1989–) and Amanda Michalka (1991–)
Kylie (1968–) and Dannii Minogue (1971–)
Mary-Kate and Ashley (twins, 1986–) and Elizabeth Olsen (1989–)
Danielle (1987–) and Kay Panabaker (1990–)
Sylvia Pasquel (1949–) and half-sisters Rocio Banquells (1963– ) and Alejandra Guzman (1969–) (Pasquel and Banquells were daughters of Rafael Banquells; Pasquel and Guzman's mother is Silvia Pinal)
Michelle (1958–) and Dedee Pfeiffer (1964–)
The Pointer Sisters: Ruth (1946–), Anita (1948–2022), Bonnie (1950–2020) and June Pointer (1953–2006)
Vanessa (1937–) and Lynn Redgrave (1943–2010)
Natasha Richardson (1963–2009) and Joely Richardson (1965–) (daughters of Vanessa Redgrave)
The Rudge Sisters
Nadia (1964–) and Julia Sawalha (1968–)
SHeDAISY: Kristyn (1970–), Kelsi (1974–), and Kassidy Osborn (1976–)
Sister Sledge; Kim, Debbie, Joni and Kathy Sledge
Jessica (1980–) and Ashlee Simpson (1984–)
Britney (1981–) and Jamie Lynn Spears (1991–)
Jennifer (1958–) and Meg Tilly (1960–)
Lisa (1965–), Christina (1981–) and Tanya Vidal (1971–)
The Wachowskis; Lana (1965–) and Lilly (1967–)
Natalie (1938–1981) and Lana Wood 
Madeline (1985–), Vanessa (1986–) and Yvonne Zima (1989–)

Celebrity siblings
John (1939–) and Mary Badham (1952–)
Actors Spencer (1992–) and Abigail (1996–) Breslin
Shirley MacLaine (1934–) and Warren Beatty (1937–) (born Shirley MacLaine and Henry Warren Beaty)
Jonas (1967–), Linn (1970–), and Jenny Berggren (1972–), all founding members of Ace of Base
Kirk Cameron (1970–) and Candace Cameron Bure (1976–)
The Carpenters — Richard (1946–) and Karen Carpenter (1950–1983)
Nick (1980–), Leslie (1986–2012) and Aaron Carter (1987–2022)
Keith Chegwin is the twin of Jeffrey Chegwin and brother of Janice Long
Bunny (1955–), Eldra "El" (1961–), James (1963–), Mark and Randy DeBarge, all members of the band DeBarge, plus five other musical siblings who were not in that band — Robert "Bobby" (1956–1995), Tommy (both members of Switch), Chico (1966–), Darryl, and Carol "Peaches" DeBarge
Karin (1975–) and Olof Dreijer (1981–); musicians, members of The Knife
Joanne Dru (1922–1996) and Peter Marshall (1927–) — born Joanne Letitia and Ralph Pierre LaCock
Rebekah (1974–), Sebastian (1989–), Peter and Dominic Elmaloglou (all appeared at one point in Home and Away)
Karolina, Marisela (1966–) and Victor Esqueda, singers
Chip, Jere and Kim Fields, actresses
Leif Garrett (1961–) and Dawn Lyn (1963–) (born Leif Per and Dawn Lyn Narvik)
 Esther Gordy Edwards (1920–2011) Anna Gordy Gaye (1922–2014) Gwen Gordy Fuqua (1927–1999) Berry Gordy (1929–) and Robert Gordy, (1931–2022)
Ilene (1949–) and Todd Graff (1959–)
Frankie (1983–) and Ariana Grande (1993–)
Oliver (1976–) and Kate Hudson (1979–)
The Jets — originally LeRoy (1965–), Eddie (1966–), Eugene (1967–), Haini (1968–), Rudy (1969–), Kathi (1970–), Elizabeth (1972–), and Moana Wolfgramm (1973–). Six younger Wolfgramm siblings are now members, namely Donnie, EtiVise, Maliana, Mika, Natalia, and Tony. Two other younger siblings, Kelela and Tiare, are in a side project, a rock band called Against the Season.
The Kelly Family
Merald "Bubba" (1942–) and Gladys Knight (1944–)
Jamie Lomas (1975–) and Charley Webb (1988–)
Michael (1958–) and Virginia Madsen (1961–)
Tia and Tamera Mowry (twins, 1978–) and Tahj Mowry (1986–)
Laila Morse (born Maureen Oldman) (1945–) and Gary Oldman (1958–)
Tracy Nelson (1963–) and twins Gunnar and Matthew Nelson (1967–)
Finneas O'Connell (1997–) and Billie Eilish (2001–)
Hayden (1989–) and Jansen Panettiere (1994–2023)
Sarah-Jane (1976–) and Andrew-Lee Potts (1979–)
Selena (1971–1995) and Abraham "A.B." Quintanilla III (1963–)
Rockwell (1964–) and half-sister Rhonda Ross Kendrick (1971–) are the children of Berry Gordy
Ananda (1942–1999) and Mamata Shankar
Taylor (1989–) and Austin Swift (1992–)
Heather (1976–), David and Nicholle Tom (fraternal twins, 1978–)
Louis (1991–) and Lottie Tomlinson (1998–)
Dick (1928–2015) and Joyce Van Patten (1934–), and half-brother Tim Van Patten (1959–)
Tom Smothers (1937–) and Dick Smothers (1938–)
Harvey Weinstein (1952–) and Bob Weinstein (1954–)
Jeff Wincott (1956–) and Michael Wincott (1958–)

See also
List of sibling pairs
List of boxing families

References

Show business
Show business